= Richard Levy (paleoclimatologist) =

New Zealand climate scientist

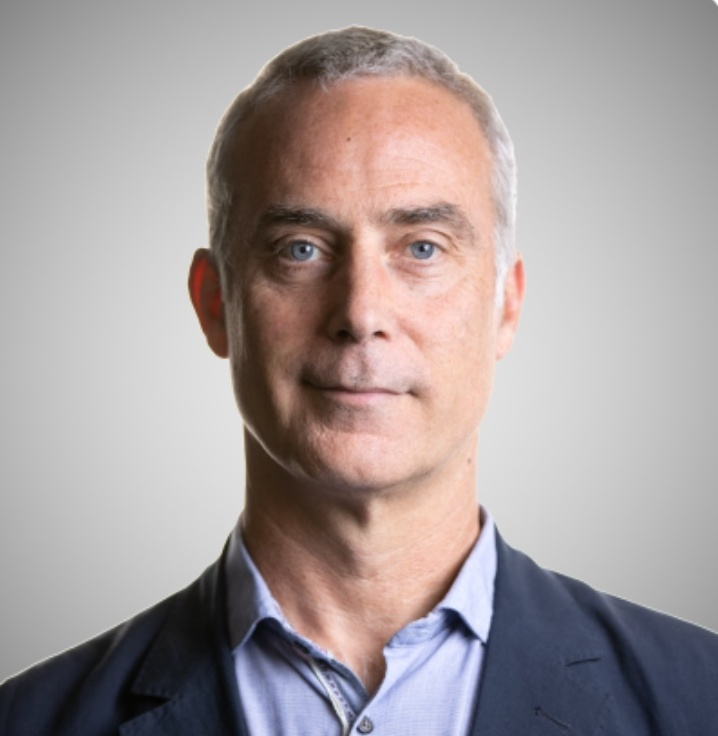
- Levy in 2019
- Born: Richard Halford Levy
- Education: University of Nebraska–Lincoln
- Scientific career
- Fields: Climate change; Paleontology
- Thesis: Middle to late eocene coastal paleoenvironments of Southern Victoria Land, East Antarctica : a palynological and sedimentological study of glacial erratics (1998)

Richard Halford Levy is a New Zealand glacial stratigrapher and paleoclimatologist with expertise in microfossil analysis. As a principal scientist at GNS Science he has been involved in international and New Zealand environmental research programmes focussing on the evolution of the Earth's climate and building an understanding of the role of greenhouse gases in causing anthropogenic climate changes, in particular those impacting global sea levels. He has had extensive experience in scientific drilling, leading major projects, including the ANtarctic geological DRILLing (ANDRILL) Program in Antarctica. Since 2018, Levy has co-led the government funded NZ SeaRise programme.

== Career and associations ==
Levy co-authored the guide for the ANDRILL project in 2006 and had a leadership role in the establishment and running of the program. From 2008 to 2019 he was a senior scientist at GNS Science, becoming a principal scientist with a specific role as Environment and Climate Theme Leader in 2019. Between 2007 and 2015, he was Project Leader for the Global Change Programme that aimed "to advance understanding of past climate and environmental change in the New Zealand region, Southern Ocean and Antarctica". Levy was Program Leader of the Past Antarctic Climate and Future Implications (PACaFI - K001), a GNS project, from 2010 to 2018, and Director of the Joint Antarctic Research Institute (2013-2017). Since 2016 he has been the National Representative on the Executive Committee of the International Continental Scientific Drilling Program. In 2018, Levy along with Tim Naish, became a leader of the NZ Searise project.

He is a staff member at the Antarctic Research Centre, Victoria University of Wellington and works with the Antarctic Science Platform on Project 1-Antarctic Ice Dynamics to investigate how models based on paleoenvironmental data can improve understanding of what controls and drives environmental change and the impact of ice melts in the Antarctica on sea levels.

== Research ==
=== Evolution of Earth's climate system ===
As a paleoclimatologist, Levy participated in research to develop an understanding of how humans have influenced Earth's climate over time. This identified patterns in the history of the Earth's climate system by analysing ice caps sealed in glaciers and sediment buried in lakes, allowing the examination of the causes of past climate change and providing data to explore the degree to which warming in the 21st century may be explained by natural causes, such as solar variability, or by human influences.

Studies in which Levy participated that involved examination of rock and sediment under the Antarctic ice sheet, concluded that because of the sensitivity of the sheet to temperature changes, it was under threat from anthropogenic climate warming caused by carbon emissions. He also stated that monitoring the ice sheets in this way would allow for predictions of how they will change as the climate warms, specifically enabling "computer models to predict how the Ross Ice Shelf and the West Antarctic Ice Sheet will change as our climate warms".

Levy contributed to a report by the World Meteorological Organisation which recorded that globally averaged concentrations of CO_{2} reached 403.3 parts per million (ppm) in 2016 up from 400ppm in 2015 and this was likely to see dangerous temperature increases by the end of the 21st century. When gathering data for this report Levy worked with other members of the GNS team, Jocelyn Turnbull and Nancy Bertler, to show that by observing rates of change in the past through the analysis of ice core records, it is possible to estimate the effect on the climate if this rate increased. The rate of increase in CO_{2} concentrations in 2017, was considerably faster than rates in the mid-Pliocene era, about 5 million years ago when similar concentrations had caused the collapse of ice sheets in Antarctica resulting in global sea levels 10 to 20 metres (33 to 66 ft) higher and temperatures 2 to 3 °C (3.6 to 5.4 °F) warmer than in 2017.

In 2019, Levy contributed to an article in the journal Nature Geoscience which explored the degree that an increasingly warm climate could affect the axial tilt or obliquity of Earth's orbit around the Sun due to a loss of sea ice through warming of the ocean, possibly triggering instability of the Antarctic Ice Sheet with dire implications for global sea levels.

=== ANtarctic Geological Drilling Program (ANDRILL) ===
Much of Levy's research has focused on recovering and interpreting geological and climate records that were "preserved beneath Antarctica's blanket of ice" and he was involved with the ANDRILL programme, an international effort investigating the role of Antarctica in global environmental change over the past 65 million years to understand how the area might respond to future global changes.

In 2007 the ANDRILL team drilled to a depth of 1,138.54 metres (3,735.4 ft) in the Southern McMurdo Sound in Antarctica and recovered sedimentary rock samples that showed a record of the last 13 million years of "glacial and climatic variation of the West Antarctic Ice Sheet and Ross Sea region". Levy contributed to a journal article in 2007 which summarised the results of the project and concluded that it was likely environmental changes in Antarctic ice volume had contributed significantly to sea levels and ocean circulation. Levy has noted that changes in Antarctica due to the Earth getting warmer and the melting of the ice, would affect sea levels and the climate around the coastal regions.

Levy joined an international consortium of scientists, who in 2010, extended the earlier work of the ANDRILL project. Frank Rack from the University of Nebraska–Lincoln who also worked on the team, explained that drilling into an earlier time could show the transition of Antarctica from being ice-free about 40 million years ago, to the creation of the ice sheet. Levy said the research showed that the ice sheets were highly sensitive to relatively small changes in CO_{2}, and this information allowed scientists to consider Earth's potential future if greenhouse gas levels and temperatures continued to rise and large parts of Antarctica became ice-free.

In 2020, as part of a $250 million redevelopment of Scott Base, Levy was a member of the GNS Science team that ran models on projected sea levels in Antarctica based on various scenarios. When discussing this research, Levy clarified that predicting sea levels in polar regions was difficult because of the complicated relationship between the melting of the ice sheets in West Antarctica and Greenland, but concluded that, based on their projections, "there [was] a 95 per cent chance that local sea level could rise or fall within the range between −116 and +164 centimetres (−3.81 and 5.38 ft) by 2120".

Part of the research carried out with ANDRILL involved establishing how Southern Ocean phytoplankton (diatoms) communities, which are an important part of the carbon cycle, responded to major environmental disturbance. Levy worked in the team that developed a model to reconstruct how diatom began as a new species, became extinct and then re-created or turnover, possibly due to climate change. The model enabled informed predictions of the effect of environmental change on this marine microflora, and other ecosystems that might be vulnerable to climate change.

=== NZ SeaRise programme ===
This 5-year research programme (2018-2023), funded by the New Zealand Ministry of Business, Innovation and Employment (NZMBIE), has the goal of enabling more accurate estimates of future sea levels on New Zealand coastlines by building knowledge of the possible impact of polar ice sheets and, "vertical land movements and changes in sea-surface height" on these. As the leader of the program, Levy acknowledged that it was difficult to make predictions of future sea levels because the New Zealand coastline was continually moving up and down, but concluded that the reducing emissions and avoiding melting of the ice sheets was key to overriding these movements of the shoreline. This confirmed earlier research in which Levy was involved.

When NZ Searise provided data in May 2022 that indicated parts of the North Island of New Zealand were sinking by almost a centimetre a year, Levy noted that due to a rapidly-changing system, the solution was not just to build walls, suggesting moving away from hard infrastructure such as concrete as these can "worsen extreme events if they're breached...[and]...in the most vulnerable locations, entire communities might have to be moved". Levy also noted the highest subsidence rates were along the Wairarapa coast, and predicted that [along that coastline], "sea levels could rise by well over one and a half metres by 2100...[following]...the least optimistic climate change scenario". Levy warned that the risk from sea-level rise in New Zealand needed to be better defined and noted that "current sea-level projections in the Ministry for the Environment coastal hazards guidance do not take into account local vertical land movements".

== Awards ==
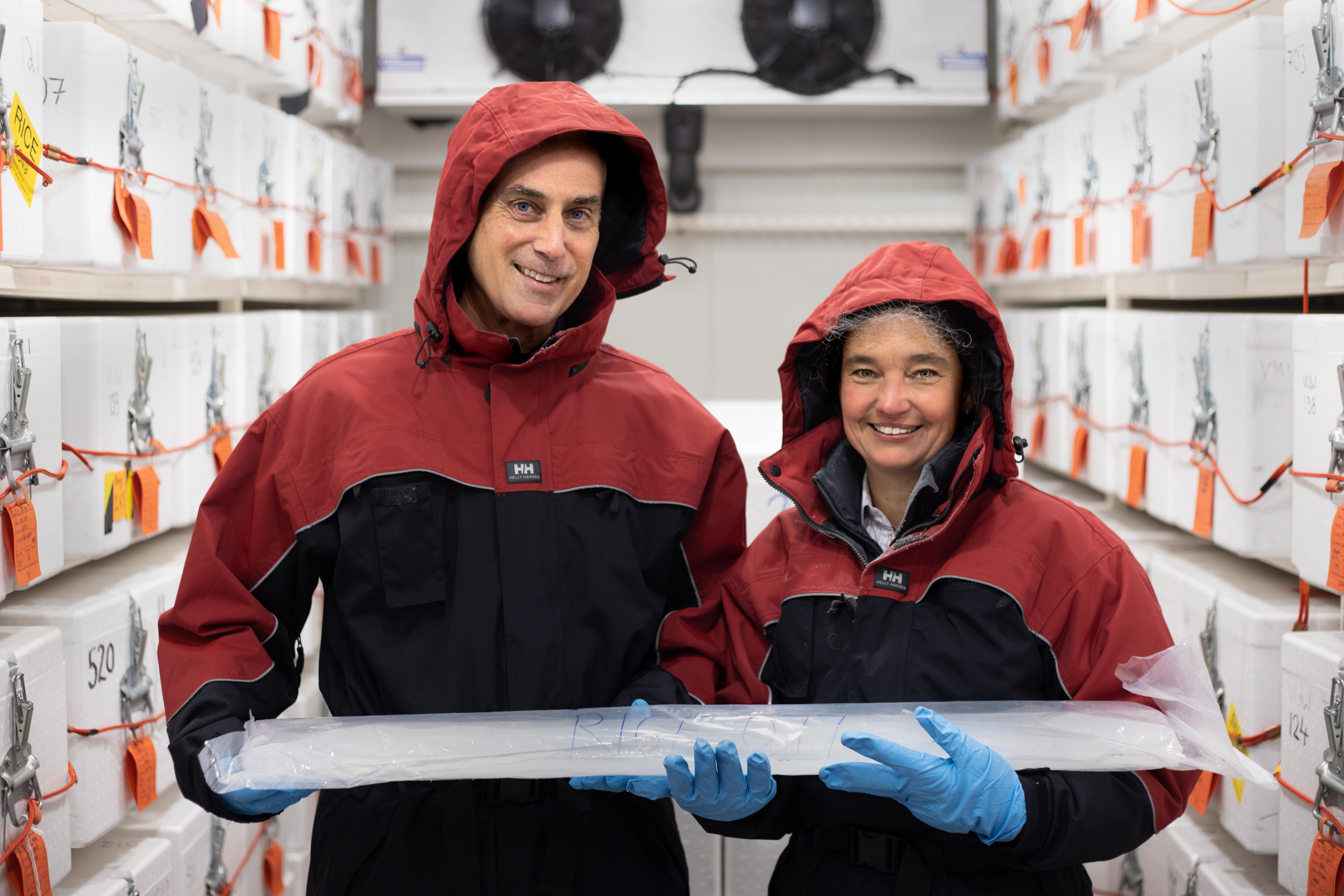
Levy and Nancy Bertler, members of the 2019 Prime Minister's Science Prize winning team

The SeaRise team was awarded the 2019 Prime Minister's Science Prize for highlighting the relationship between global warming, melting Antarctic ice and rising sea levels. Their prediction that the melting of the Southern Continent could cause the flooding of coastal cities and regions, helped support the targets of the 2015 Paris Agreement, and Levy said he was humbled "because we love what we do and we feel we're doing something important." Levy credited Tim Naish with bringing the team together, noting that "this work requires connections. It's not something we can do by ourselves and it takes a massive team effort. Tim Naish has had the vision of what's needed and brought all the components together to help us achieve what we have". He also said that winning the award was significant [because] "we need to tell people what we know and help them understand why it's important to act sooner rather than later".
