= Rob McKay =

New Zealand scientist

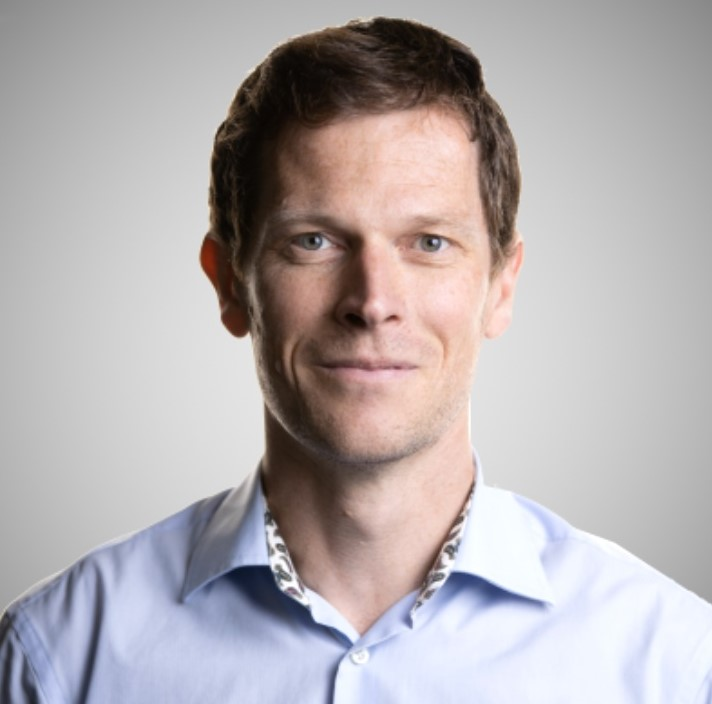
- Born: Robert Murray McKay
- Education: Victoria University of Wellington
- Scientific career
- Fields: Glaciology and climate science
- Workplaces: Victoria University of Wellington; Antarctic Research Centre
- Thesis: Late Cenozoic (13-0 Myr) Glacimarine Sedimentology, Facies Analysis, and Sequence Stratigraphy from the Western Ross Embayment, Antarctica: Implications for the Variability of the Antarctic Ice Sheets (2008)
- Doctoral advisors: Tim Naish; Peter Barrett

Robert Murray McKay is a New Zealand paleoceanographer who specialises in sedimentology, stratigraphy and palaeoclimatology, specifically gathering geological evidence to study how marine-based portions of the Antarctic ice sheet behave in response to abrupt climate and oceanic change. He has been involved in examination of marine sedimentary records and glacial deposits to show melting and cooling in Antarctica over the past 65 million years and how this has influenced global sea levels and climate. This has helped climate change scientists overcome uncertainty about how the ice sheets will respond to global warming and how this can be managed effectively in the 21st century. He has participated in international projects including ANDRILL and the International Ocean Discovery Program (IODP), led major New Zealand government-funded research teams and has received several awards in recognition of his work. Since 2023 McKay has been a full professor at Victoria University of Wellington and from 2019, director of the Antarctic Research Centre.

== Education and career ==
McKay attended Hutt Valley High School before beginning tertiary study at Victoria University of Wellington, where he had originally intended to study architecture but changed to science when he got "hooked on the geology course taken during the preliminary year". After graduating from the university with a BSc in 1998, MacKay was involved in a project to study glacial deposits in mountains near Nelson, New Zealand, when he was contacted by Peter Barrett and invited to take part in a similar project in the Transantarctic Mountains. He spent seven weeks in the Antarctic. McKay worked with Barrett to complete his master's degree in 2000, and in that year went to the United Kingdom and had a job editing research reports at an investment bank. While working in England, McKay was again asked by Barrett in 2005 to join the ANDRILL McMurdo Ice Shelf Project. This provided McKay with the opportunity to do PhD research and he noted that Victoria University had "expanded to run the Antarctic Research Centre and had a greater focus on international collaboration...[and therefore]...decided that pursuing a PhD there would be a good career move". The PhD was completed at Victoria University in 2008. He became a FRST Postdoctoral Research Fellow at Victoria University until 2012, and in 2023 was promoted to full professor at the same university. Since 2019, McKay has been Director of the Antarctic Research Centre and involved in the Antarctic Science Platform, investigating, in his role as a Paleoceanographer, "oceanic and global climate response to past loss of the Antarctic Ice Sheets and sea ice".

== Research ==
McKay has been involved in research that explored how stability in the Antarctic oceans and ice sheets could be linked to historical changes in the climate over millions of years. He said that "uncertainty about how Antarctic ice sheets will respond to global warming remains one of the most important issues facing climate change scientists...[and]...better knowledge in this area has particular relevance for New Zealand because we sit at a major gateway where water from Antarctica enters the world's oceans". McKay told Jamie Morton, science reporter for the New Zealand Herald: "One of our tasks in the geological community is to try to identify such events in the geological past and see how the Earth as a whole reacted."

The lack of certainty around exactly how the Antarctic ice sheet would respond to anthropogenic climate forcing was highlighted in a review of the literature co-authored by McKay. The review considered the "future estimates and consequences of global sea level rise from melting of the AIS, and highlight[ed] priority research areas...[because]...The Antarctic Ice Sheet (AIS) is the largest potential source of and most uncertain contributor to global sea level rise...[and]...The response of the AIS to anthropogenic climate warming in terms of the time scales of ice loss and where the ice loss occurs, will depend on the extent of climate warming and interactions between the ice sheet and the atmosphere, ocean, and the solid Earth". McKay had participated in earlier research that aimed to inform scientific understanding of the response of both the West and East Antarctic Ice Sheet during the Last Glacial Maximum (LGM), and confirmed that some of the evidence was "poorly documented...[urging]...the geological community to target the many regions of the ice sheet where data are lacking...in particular, more chronological work is required".

He has stressed the importance of understanding the role of sea ice in keeping carbon dioxide in the ocean rather than the atmosphere and the implications if human activity caused more warming, leading to the melting of the ice and subsequent rise in sea levels, which geological records of melting ice sheets that at the end of the last ice age, 20,000 years ago, suggested could rise at the level of 1 metre per century. To explore the question of how much warming was required to melt the West Antarctic Ice Sheet, McKay was involved in research collecting marine sediments from under the ice sheet. This research showed that in the mid Pliocene climate period, three to five million years ago, the ice sheet did melt, and there was greatly reduced sea ice in the Ross Sea. At that time, CO_{2} levels of 400 parts per million (similar to today’s values), and temperatures were 2–3 degrees higher than today, similar to those projected in upcoming decades. The work also highlighted the role the Antarctic ice sheet played in helping to regulate global climate changes. While the research has not been able to definitively determine the rate of future melting of the ice sheet, it has provided critical data to help guide and train computer models used to project future sea level rise.

A paper co-authored by McKay in 2016 reviewed the evidence gathered from ANDRILL-2A core samples of how the ice sheet reacted to variations of CO_{2} levels in the early to mid-Miocene period which preceded the Pliocene period. In the abstract, the paper noted the importance of the mid-Miocene period because "global temperatures and atmospheric CO_{2} concentrations were similar to those projected for coming centuries...[and it included]...the Miocene Climatic Optimum, a period of global warmth during which average surface temperatures were 3–4 °C higher than today". Further research of sediments from the Miocene period was later completed in 2021 to establish how the circulation of the ocean affected the deposition of these sediments and provided insight into how warm waters could result in melting of the Antarctic ice shelves. The paper for this research, co-authored by McKay, noted that "the study on how the ice sheets and the oceans interacted in the past provides important constraints to improve numerical ice sheet models and sea level projections".

Research in 2020 in which McKay was involved, explored why in recent decades, contrary to models generally showing a decrease, Antarctic sea-ice has increased while the ice shelf has thinned. A Holocene sediment core off East Antarctica was examined and showed that there had been a rapid sea-ice increase during the mid-Holocene period, despite melting glaciers and climate warming. The study concluded that there was a "data-model mismatch...[and suggested]...better representation of the role of evolving ice shelf cavities on oceanic water mass evolution and sea-ice dynamics... will be fundamental to understanding the oceanographic and glaciological implications of future ice shelf loss in the Antarctic...[and]...Incorporating this feedback mechanism into global climate models will be important for future projections of Antarctic changes". Subsequent work on this core showed biological productivity in this region was heavily influenced by sea ice break up events associated with the El Nino Southern Oscillation.

== Specific research projects ==
McKay has explained that when he joined Peter Barrett on the Antarctic Geological Drilling project (ANDRILL) in 2005, the original purpose of the work for his PhD was to focus on sedimentary petrology. However after finding evidence of "past cycles of ice sheet expansion and retraction...[interpretation and documentation of these]...confirmed that the ice sheet was highly variable, which had been the subject of speculation." A paper published in the Geological Society of America Bulletin in 2009, was described as "the most complete single record to date of Late Neogene and Quaternary Antarctic Ice Sheet oscillations. When drilling began on the R/V JOIDES Resolution as part of the IODP expedition 318 off Wilkes Land, next to the East Antarctic Ice Shelf in 2010 to further investigate links between past climate change and the stability of the Antarctic ice sheets, as one of the scientists involved in the project, McKay said there would be "potential overlaps with drilling the ship has just done in the Canterbury Basin, and advances and retreats in glaciation seen in other drilling projects, including the big ANDRILL project carried out by New Zealand drillers on the Ross Sea ice for a multinational consortium".

By 2018 McKay was co-chief scientist the International Ocean Discovery Program (IODP) and one of a team of 30 international scientists that went to Antarctica on the JOIDES Resolution research vessel and conducted a project known as Expedition 374 that drilled under the sea bed of the Ross Sea. The object was to get samples that could provide insight into what happened to the ice sheets over the past 20 million years ago during a time of global warming and how this could predict possible collapse of the ice sheet and result in a rising sea levels. McKay said that there was evidence that it had happened before, and "we know that from just simple physics that if you raise greenhouse gas concentrations, the temperature will go up."

In 2013 he was awarded a Rutherford Discovery Fellowship administered by the Royal Society of New Zealand for a project entitled: Antarctic Ice Sheet-Southern Ocean interactions during greenhouse worlds of the past 23 million years – and consequences for New Zealand climate. In 2016 and 2019 he was awarded Royal Society of New Zealand Marsden Fund Grants as a Principal Investigator, to investigate the role of past ocean and ice sheet change. The Rutherford Discovery Fellowships are aimed at scientists and in their early-to mid-career, and Tim Naish, who was Director of the Antarctic Research Team at the time, noted that recipients needed to have "proven research excellence...[and become]...leaders in their respective areas."

== Awards ==
For his contributions to developing an understanding of the implications of historical environmental change in the Antarctica for ongoing global warming, McKay received the New Zealand Prime Minister's MacDiarmid Emerging Scientist Prize 2011. Tim Naish, described McKay as an "articulate communicator and a talented emerging scientist that New Zealand needs to maintain its world class Antarctic and climate research capability", and Robert Dunbar, Professor of Earth Science at Stanford University noted that McKay's work in "analysing what happened the last time Earth experienced atmospheric CO_{2} levels comparable to what we expect in the next 20 years is leading edge, invaluable research as we struggle to understand our future in the face of a rapidly changing climate". At the time, McKay said he was planning to use the award to base himself in Europe for some time, "to work on international projects such as the Andrill McMurdo Ice Shelf Project and the Integrated Ocean Drilling Programme Expedition."

He was part of team of scientists that won the Prime Minister's Science Prize, Aotearoa New Zealand in 2019 for their research that showed the "Antarctic melt due to climate change could contribute to global sea level rise of 1.4 metres by the year 2100, rather than the one metre predicted back in 2013 by the Intergovernmental Panel on Climate Change (IPCC)."

McKay was awarded the 2020 Asahiko Taira Scientific Ocean Drilling Research Prize by the American Geophysical Union (AGU) for his "contributions to Antarctic glacial history, especially through scientific ocean drilling...[and in recognition of]...leadership in understanding the links between ice sheets and climate change."
