= Julie Brigham-Grette =

American glacial geologist

Dr. Julie Brigham-Grette
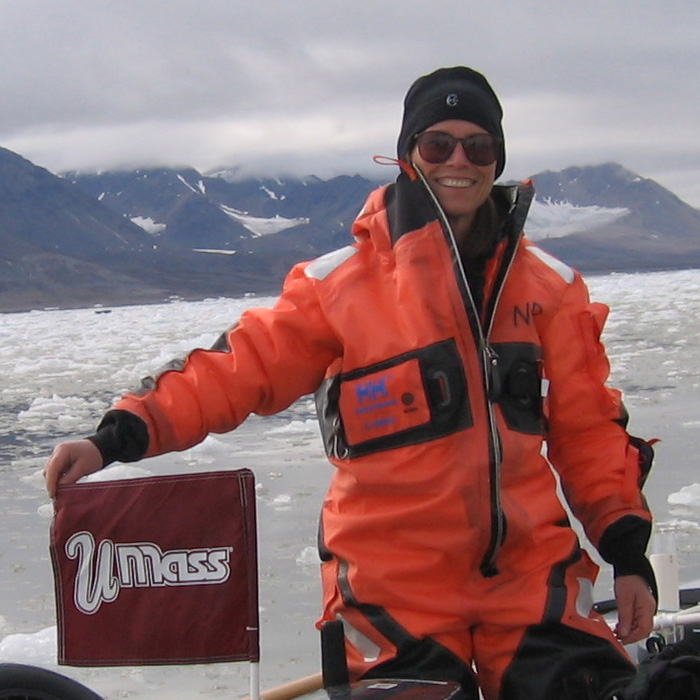
- Brigham-Grette in Norway, 2008
- Education: Albion College; University of Colorado Boulder
- Awards: American Geophysical Union Fellow 2016; Geological Society of America Fellow 2002
- Scientific career
- Fields: Quaternary geology, Paleoclimate, Glacial Geology
- Workplaces: University of Massachusetts Amherst
- Theses: Stratigraphy, Amino Acid Geochronology, and Genesis of Quaternary Sediments, Broughton Island, S.E. Baffin Island, Canada (1980); Marine Stratigraphy and Amino Acid Geochronology of the Gubik Formation, western Arctic Coastal Plain, Alaska (1985)

Julie Brigham-Grette is a glacial geologist and professor in the Department of Geosciences at the University of Massachusetts Amherst. She is a co-director of the Joseph Hartshorn Quaternary Laboratory.

Her research focuses on glacial geology and paleoclimatology, stratigraphy and sedimentology, particularly the study of arctic marine and terrestrial paleoclimate records. She has conducted research on climate evolution from the late Cenozoic ice age to the present, with an emphasis on the Beringia and Bering Strait regions.

Brigham-Grette has participated in international scientific collaborations, including the Lake El'gygytgyn Drilling Project in Northeastern Russia that examined past Arctic climate conditions.

== Early life and education ==
Brigham-Grette received a BA in geology from Albion College in 1976, graduating magna cum laude. An undergraduate course on glaciers and the Pleistocene, and the mentorship of Professor Lawrence D. Taylor, influenced her interest in glacial geology and paleoclimatology.

In 1977, Brigham-Grette began her graduate studies at the Institute of Arctic and Alpine Research (INSTAAR) at the University of Colorado Boulder. There, she worked with Professor John T. Andrews, investigating the glacial and sea-level record of a region in the Cumberland Peninsula on Baffin Island. In August 1980, Brigham-Grette received her MSc in Geology in August 1980 with the thesis titled "Stratigraphy, Amino Acid Geochronology, and Genesis of Quaternary Sediments, Broughton Island, S.E. Baffin Island, Canada." This research led to her dissertation project, where she continued to focus on Arctic climate change and investigated the Pliocene–Pleistocene sea level history of the Alaskan Arctic Coastal Plain, working under the direction of Professor Gifford H. Miller (University of Colorado Boulder) and Dr. David M. Hopkins (U.S. Geological Survey).

Brigham-Grette received her PhD from the University of Colorado Boulder in May 1985, with the dissertation "Marine Stratigraphy and Amino Acid Geochronology of the Gubik Formation, Western Arctic Coastal Plain, Alaska." Her graduate degrees incorporated the technique of amino acid geochronology (amino acid dating), which estimates the time passed since the death of an individual organism based on the changes in indigenous proteins preserved in carbonate shells. Brigham-Grette utilized this technique to correlate regional stratigraphic sections to resolve glacial geologic and sea-level history.

== Research and career ==
Following her graduate work, she was a Postdoctoral Research Fellow at the University of Bergen from November 1983 to December 1984, where she collaborated with Dr. Hans-Petter Sejrup on the Geochronology of Quaternary sediments in the North Sea.

Subsequently, from May 1985 to May 1987, Brigham-Grette served as a Postdoctoral Research Fellow in the Department of Geology at the University of Alberta and the Geological Survey of Canada. She worked with Dr. Steven Blasco (Bedford Institute of Oceanography) on the stratigraphy and geochronology of the Canadian Beaufort Sea Continental Shelf.

In 1987, she became an assistant professor at the University of Massachusetts Amherst in what was then the Department of Geology & Geography (now Geosciences). Brigham-Grette was a visiting professor at the Alaska Quaternary Center, University of Alaska Museum of the North, Fairbanks, from January to June 1990. In 1993, she became the third tenured female faculty member in the Department of Geosciences at the University of Massachusetts Amherst, and was promoted to professor in 2001. Brigham-Grette teaches courses in glacial geology, Quaternary glacial stratigraphy, geochronology, and oceanography. Brigham-Grette is the first woman to serve as the Graduate Program Director for the Department of Earth, Geographic, and Climate Sciences at the University of Massachusetts Amherst (2013–present).

Brigham-Grette has served in numerous leadership roles in the international Arctic science community. She has been a member of the Polar Research Board of the National Academy of Sciences since 2008 and the board’s chair since 2014. She co-chaired the DOSECC Scientific Steering Committee to direct the renewed US Continental Drilling Program from 2010 to 2012 and was Vice-Chair of the DOSECC Board of Directors from 2011 to 2013. Since 2013, Brigham-Grette has been a member of the American Geophysical Union (AGU) Governance Board.

Throughout her career, Brigham-Grette has also served on and directed panels and committees for the American Quaternary Association, U.S. Arctic Research Commission Logistics Joint Task Force, National Science Foundation, Geological Society of America, Past Global Changes (PAGES), the National Lacustrine Core Facility (LacCore), and the National Research Council, among others. Brigham-Grette has also served as an editor and been a member of the editorial board for the following scientific journals: Quaternary International, Quaternary Science Reviews, Climate of the Past.

== Research contributions ==
Brigham-Grette received grants to study Lake Elgygytgyn in 1996 and 2000. She was also one of the principal investigators in the 2009 Lake Elgygytgyn drilling project, which received funding in 2005. This project led to the recovery of the lake's sedimentary sequence. Data from the drilling project was used in papers about both the Pleistocene's and later the Pliocene's arctic climate.

== Teaching and outreach ==
Brigham-Grette teaches about Arctic climate change. Since 2003, Brigham-Grette has led the Research Experiences for Undergraduates (REU) training program in Svalbard (Norway). This program provides undergraduates with hands-on research investigating the links between climate, glacial mass balance, sediment transport, and lake and fjord sedimentation from a location that has experienced warming over the past 90 years. Brigham-Grette has worked with four teachers since 2009 as part of Polar TREC, a program that brings high school teachers to the Arctic to participate in field research expeditions.

Brigham-Grette has discussed how paleoclimate data can help understand current and future climate change. She has given numerous lectures and appeared on radio shows talking about how the Arctic climate has changed since the Pliocene and what can be expected as climate change continues.

== Awards ==
- 2002 Elected Fellow Geological Society of America
- 2003 Albion College Distinguished Alumni Award
- 2011-2012 UMASS Samuel F. Conti Faculty Research Fellowship
- 2015 Austrian Academy of Sciences Suess Lecture
- 2015 University of Southampton Gregory Lecture
- 2015 AGU Global Environmental Change Tyndall Lecturer
- 2016 Elected Fellow American Geophysical Union
