= Nancy Bertler =

Antarctic researcher

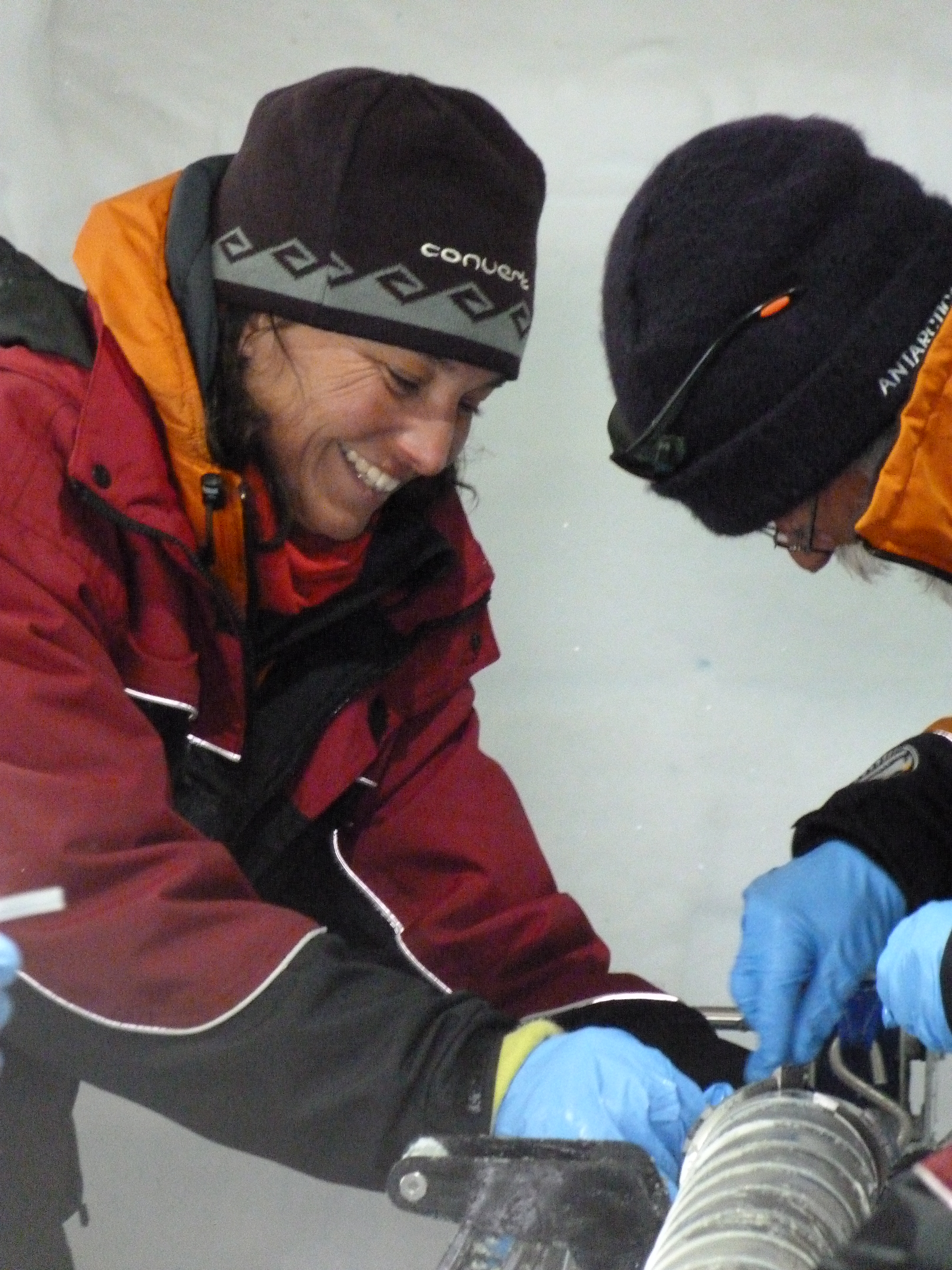
- Nancy Bertler at Roosevelt Island
- Education: B.Sc. LMU Munich; M.Sc. Royal Holloway; PhD Victoria University of Wellington
- Scientific career
- Fields: Past climate
- Workplaces: Victoria University; GNS Science
- Doctoral advisor: Peter Barrett (geologist)
- Website: Nancy Bertler at Victoria University

Nancy Bertler is a German-New Zealand Antarctic researcher. She has led major initiatives to investigate climate history using Antarctic ice cores, and best known for her leadership of the Roosevelt Island Climate Evolution Programme (RICE). She is a full professor at the Antarctic Research Centre at Victoria University of Wellington in New Zealand.

== Early life and education ==
Bertler was born in Munich, Germany. She completed her undergraduate degree in geology and geography in 1996 at LMU Munich. In 1999, she graduated with an M.Sc. in Quaternary science from Royal Holloway at the University of London, UK. Bertler then moved to New Zealand to commence her PhD in geology at the Victoria University of Wellington under the supervision of Peter Barrett, then director of the Antarctic Research Centre. She completed her PhD in 2004.

== Career and impact ==
Bertler researches climate history using ice cores. During her PhD Nancy established collaborations with international partners in Germany and the US and initiated New Zealand's ice core research capability in the Ross Sea. As postdoctoral fellow with guidance and help by her mentors, Profs. Peter Barrett, Tim Naish, Alex Malahoff, Bertler went on to establish major infrastructure in support of ice core research in New Zealand. This included the development of a national ice core research facility with GNS Science, the building of a New Zealand intermediate ice core drilling system with Victoria University of Wellington. Since her joint appointment with Victoria University of Wellington and GNS Science in 2004, Bertler has led and managed the National Ice Core Research Programme. This culminated in the successful development of international science projects – in particular the NZ contribution to the International TransAntarctic Scientific Expedition (ITASE) project and the NZ-led 9-nation Roosevelt Island Climate Evolution (RICE) project, the latter of which she is the Chief Scientist.

Bertler was one of the early pioneers to target and interpret ice core records from the Antarctic coastal regions. These records have proven to provide highly complementary information to the deep ice core records from the Antarctic interior. Bertler is a leading or co-author on 39 internationally peer-reviewed publications and three peer-reviewed book chapters. She also co-authored two book chapters for public outreach and has worked with a large range of media.

Bertler has led 13 scientific expeditions to Antarctica with over 30 months (cumulative) of field work including leading the 9 nation Roosevelt Island Climate Evolution (RICE) ice coring project in Antarctica.

== Awards and honours ==
Bertler was awarded a Rutherford Discovery Fellowship in 2011 and is Chief Scientist and Field Leader of Roosevelt Island Climate Evolution Programme (RICE), 9 nation ice core drilling project (NZ, USA, Denmark, Germany, United Kingdom, Italy, Australia, China, Sweden). She has featured in numerous science communication features

In 2016, Bertler received a Blake Leader Award from the Sir Peter Blake Trust.
