= Sherwood Wise =

American academic geologist

Sherwood Wise is an American academic geologist and currently a Professor of Geological Science at Florida State University, he also serves as co-director of the Antarctic Marine Geology Research Facility and participates in the ANDRILL (ANtarctic geological DRILLing) project. He is an Elected Fellow of the American Association for the Advancement of Science.
