= Megan Balks =

New Zealand Antarctic soil scientist

Megan Balks NZAM
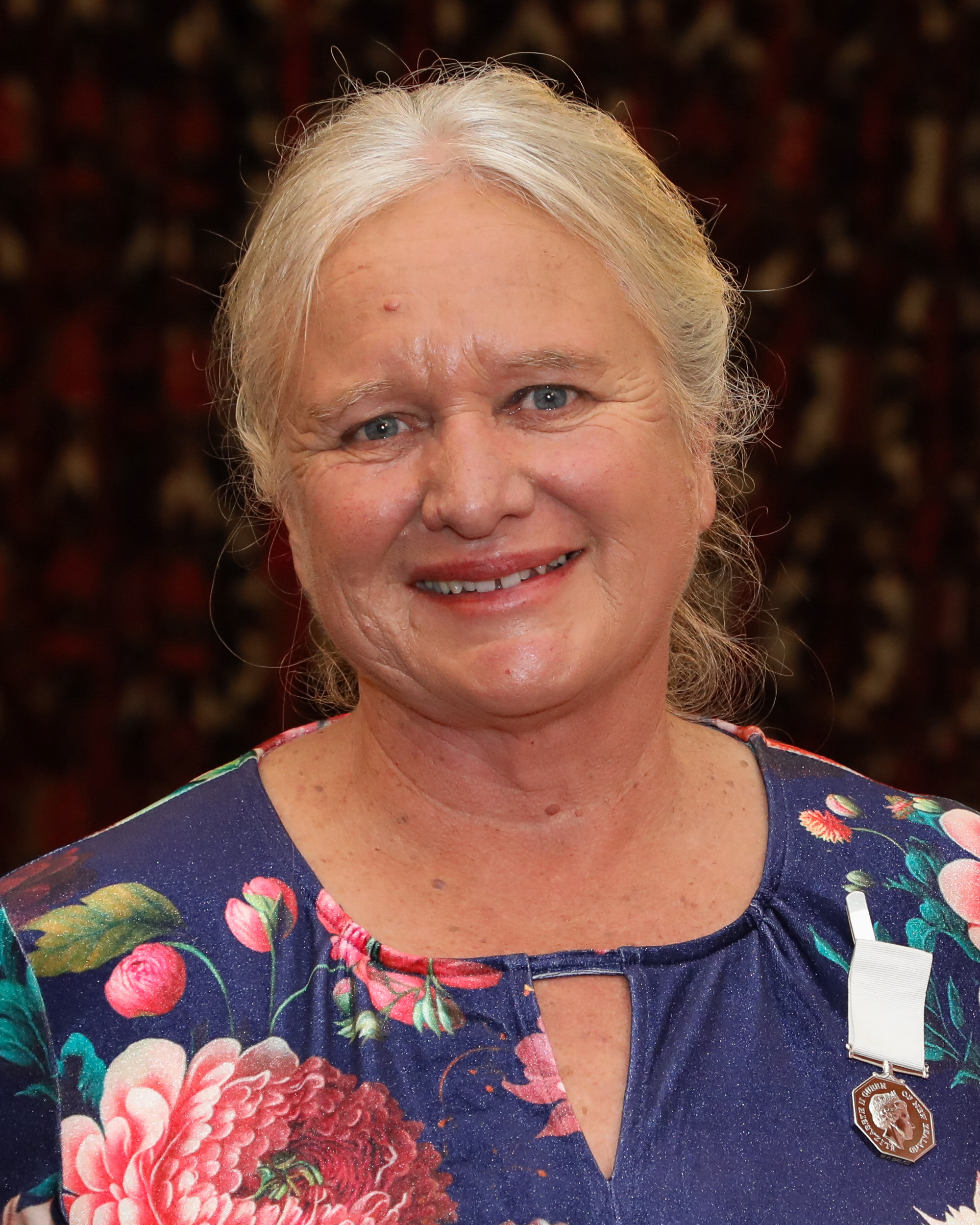
- Balks in 2024
- Born: 1960 (age 65–66); Wairarapa, New Zealand
- Education: Massey University; University of Waikato
- Spouse: Errol
- Scientific career
- Fields: Soil science
- Workplaces: University of Waikato
- Thesis: Some effects of land treatment/disposal of New Zealand meat processing plant effluent on soil properties (1995)

Megan Ruby Balks NZAM (born 1960) is a New Zealand Antarctic soil scientist and former lecturer at the University of Waikato.

== Early life and education ==
Born in 1960, Balks was raised on a sheep farm in the Wairarapa, giving her an appreciation of the environment, and she wanted to become a geologist. She studied at Massey University, completing a Bachelor of Science honours degree in soil science.

== Career ==
Balks lectured at the University of Waikato from 1988 until she left in 2018, and mentored 10 Antarctic soil research graduate students.

In 1990, Balks, along with other soil scientists, started researching Antarctica's permafrosts and its human environmental impact. When offered this role, she was sceptical as she did not believe that the Antarctic would have much soil to study. In her first project, she looked at soil from an airstrip that the United States built in the 1950s. In total, she completed 19 Antarctic field expeditions, including 12 as field leader. She and the other researchers placed soil climate monitoring stations in the Antarctic, reporting to the Circumpolar Active Layer Monitoring (CALM) programme, which measure the effects of climate change in the polar regions.

From the mid 1990s to 2001, Balks was a member of the Waikato Conservation Board. From 2000 to 2023, she was a member of the Crysol Working Group of the International Union of Soil Sciences, and was co-chair for two years. From 2008 to 2022, Balks represented New Zealand on the council of the International Permafrost Association, where in 2019, she created its first Southern Hemisphere regional permafrost conference. Her other roles include being a founding member and secretary of the ANTPAS (Antarctic Permafrost and Soils), a member of the Royal Society of New Zealand's Committee on Antarctic Research, a member of the New Zealand Geographic Board Committee of Place Naming in the Ross Sea Region of Antarctica, and president of the New Zealand Society of Soil Science from 2018 to 2020. As of 2024, she is review editor of the State of the World Soils Report of the UN Food and Agriculture Organization.

In 2021, Balks and other two other researchers published the book Soils of Aotearoa New Zealand. It has 18 chapters and describes New Zealand's soils according to the New Zealand Soil Classification.

In the 2024 New Year Honours, Balks was awarded the New Zealand Antarctic Medal, for services to Antarctic soil science.

== Personal life ==
Balks has a husband named Errol. Around the 1980s the two moved to Dunedin due to Balks' work in Central Otago, and so that Errol could study land surveying. They now live in Waikato and have their own nature reserve, where they have a breed of sheep that produces a fibre that Balks uses in a craft hobby.
