= Conservation International Aotearoa =

Programme of Conservation International in Aotearoa New Zealand

- Abbreviation: CI Aotearoa
- Type: Programme
- Region served: New Zealand; Pacific region
- Fields: Ocean protection; Marine conservation; climate action; Blue carbon; policy research
- Parent organization: Conservation International
- Website: aotearoa.conservation.org

Conservation International Aotearoa is the Aotearoa New Zealand programme of Conservation International. It focuses on iwi and Māori-led ocean initiatives in Aotearoa New Zealand and on partnerships across the wider Pacific, including the Hinemoana Halo Ocean Initiative, an Indigenous-led ocean programme centred on ocean protection and climate action.

In Aotearoa New Zealand, the programme has contributed to government-commissioned policy research on coastal wetland blue carbon and partnered with the Department of Conservation and Manta Watch NZ on oceanic manta ray research. Across the Pacific, it has also taken part in whale-research voyages and scientific expeditions, including work in Tonga and Tokelau.

== Overview ==
The programme works in Aotearoa New Zealand and across the broader Pacific. Its geographic scope includes Māori-led ocean initiatives in Aotearoa New Zealand, Pacific partnerships and fieldwork in places such as Tonga and Tokelau, and marine-science and coastal-wetland work in New Zealand waters.

Its thematic work includes Indigenous ocean guardianship, blue carbon and coastal-wetland policy work, marine science and citizen-science partnerships, and Pacific partnerships and field expeditions.

== History ==
Publicly documented activity by the programme emerged in 2022 around iwi and Māori-led ocean work in Aotearoa New Zealand and collaboration with Pacific partners through Hinemoana Halo. At COP27, the film Moana Rising brought public attention to the initiative and described it as an Indigenous-led blue carbon regime developed in collaboration with Conservation International. Ngāti Kurī later reported that Conservation International Aotearoa had invited its representatives to take part in COP27 discussions and attend the launch of the initiative, which aimed to use traditional ocean customs and practices to protect Aotearoa New Zealand's coastal waters and high seas and develop natural assets for carbon credits and biodiversity credits within a blue-economy framework.

In 2023, the initiative featured in Pacific advocacy and fundraising. Māori leaders proposed protecting whales in international waters at the United Nations General Assembly, and at COP28 a Māori-led climate venture linked to Hinemoana Halo announced a US$50 million commitment toward a stated US$100 million goal.

In 2024, the programme's public profile extended into policy and Pacific fieldwork. It contributed to government-commissioned research on coastal wetland blue carbon in Aotearoa New Zealand, while Pacific partners used the canoe Hinemoana II for a whale-research voyage from Tonga. During the same year, Pacific leaders signed He Whakaputanga Moana, a declaration proposing legal personhood for whales.

In 2025, Conservation International Aotearoa remained involved in marine and coastal research through a Conservation International-led scientific expedition to Tokelau, a partnership on oceanic manta ray research in New Zealand waters, and further national reporting on blue carbon habitats and coastal carbon sequestration.

== Programmes and operations ==
Selected programme locations mentioned in the article (1 Te Hiku o Te Ika (Ngāti Kurī); 2 Ōpōtiki (Te Whānau a Apanui partnership); 3 Te Tauihu)

=== Hinemoana Halo and Pacific partnerships ===
Through Hinemoana Halo, Conservation International Aotearoa partners with Indigenous Māori and Pacific groups, along with scientists, economists and investors, to develop ocean-based solutions for ocean protection and climate leadership. Programme materials describe an approach that combines traditional knowledge with science to support protection, care, management and monitoring of coastal waters and high seas, while linking this work to self-determination and a sustainable financing mechanism intended to provide marine protection and direct benefits to iwi and Māori communities.

Hinemoana Halo is described as a partnership of seven Indigenous groups and works on nature-based solutions associated with blue carbon and biodiversity habitats across the Pacific. The programme also promotes the Pacific Guardians Initiative as part of Conservation International's Guardians programme, supporting Indigenous-led marine stewardship through customary knowledge, science and education.

=== Tokelau, Tonga and Pacific fieldwork ===
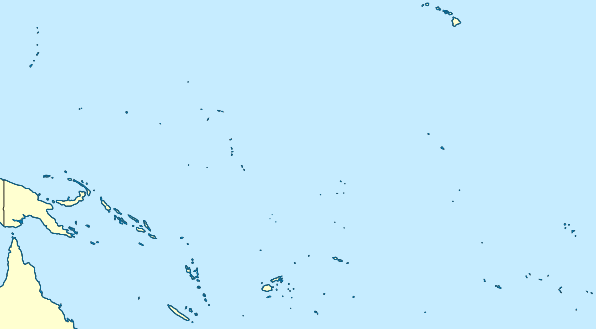
Selected programme locations mentioned in the article in the Pacific region (1 Tokelau scientific expedition; 2 Tonga (Hinemoana II voyage))

In March and April 2025, a Conservation International Aotearoa-led rapid assessment expedition undertaken with New Zealand Geographic worked across Tokelau's three atolls of Atafu, Nukunonu and Fakaofo. Alongside scientific marine assessments, the expedition focused on co-developing an environmental education programme and supporting sustainable ocean-management work, and included community consultations with men's groups, women's groups and local youth, as well as citizen-science training. Reporting on the expedition said Tokelau's coral reefs showed signs of recovery after earlier coral bleaching.

In July 2024, an all-female Pacific-crewed voyage on the canoe Hinemoana II set out from Aotearoa for Tonga to gather whale data. The voyage involved the Tongan Voyaging Society, Te Whānau a Apanui and Conservation International Aotearoa and was presented as combining scientific research with traditional knowledge.

=== Marine research in Aotearoa waters ===
New Zealand's Department of Conservation, Manta Watch NZ and Conservation International Aotearoa have partnered on research on oceanic manta rays in New Zealand waters. In 2025, the latest national conservation-status assessment changed the oceanic manta ray from Data Deficient to Threatened – Nationally Vulnerable.

The same assessment reported that since 2019, 28 oceanic manta rays had been satellite tagged and more than 200 individuals had been photographically identified in Aotearoa New Zealand waters. Manta Watch NZ describes the tagging work as part of a collaborative research project involving Conservation International Aotearoa, the University of Auckland, the Department of Conservation and Tindale Marine Research Charitable Trust. Partner reporting also described support for satellite tagging and for the development of a best-practice guide for in-water encounters with manta rays.

=== Aotearoa New Zealand coastal wetlands and blue carbon ===
Conservation International Aotearoa contributed to government-commissioned policy research on coastal wetland blue carbon in Aotearoa New Zealand. The research described mangroves, saltmarsh and seagrass as the main coastal blue-carbon habitats in Aotearoa New Zealand and examined their role in conservation, restoration and carbon sequestration.

Expanding temperate mangrove forests in Aotearoa New Zealand were estimated to capture carbon, with implications discussed for national climate mitigation policy and reporting.

A national dataset was developed to support coastal wetland blue carbon mapping and associated carbon stock information, and pilot sediment organic carbon measurements were reported for coastal blue carbon habitats in Te Tauihu. National environmental reporting later provided estimates for saltmarsh, mangroves and seagrass extent in New Zealand's estuaries and coastal areas and reported annual carbon sequestration estimates for those habitats based on a national assessment.

Selected marine and coastal contexts of Conservation International Aotearoa
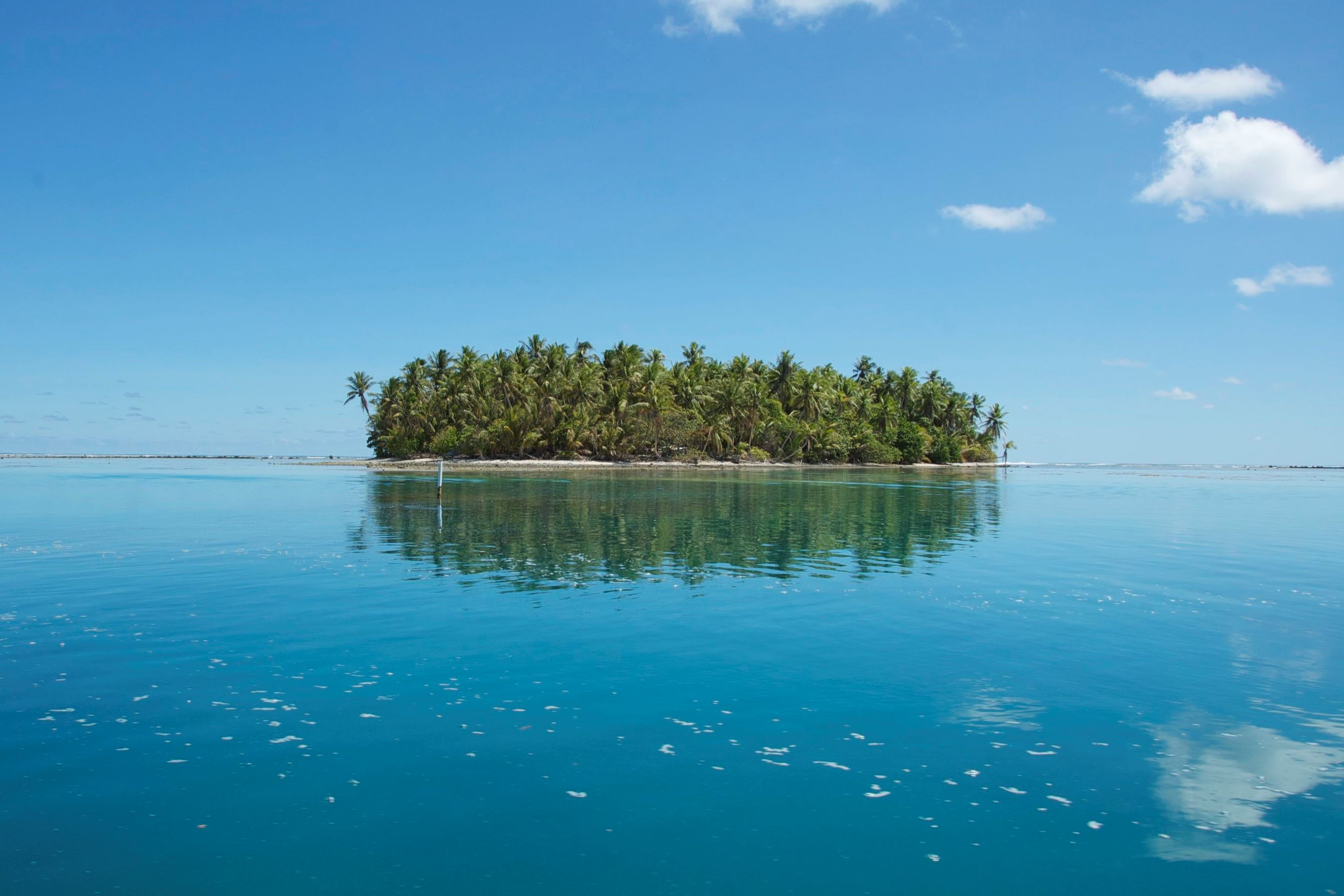
Tokelau, where Conservation International Aotearoa led a 2025 rapid assessment expedition

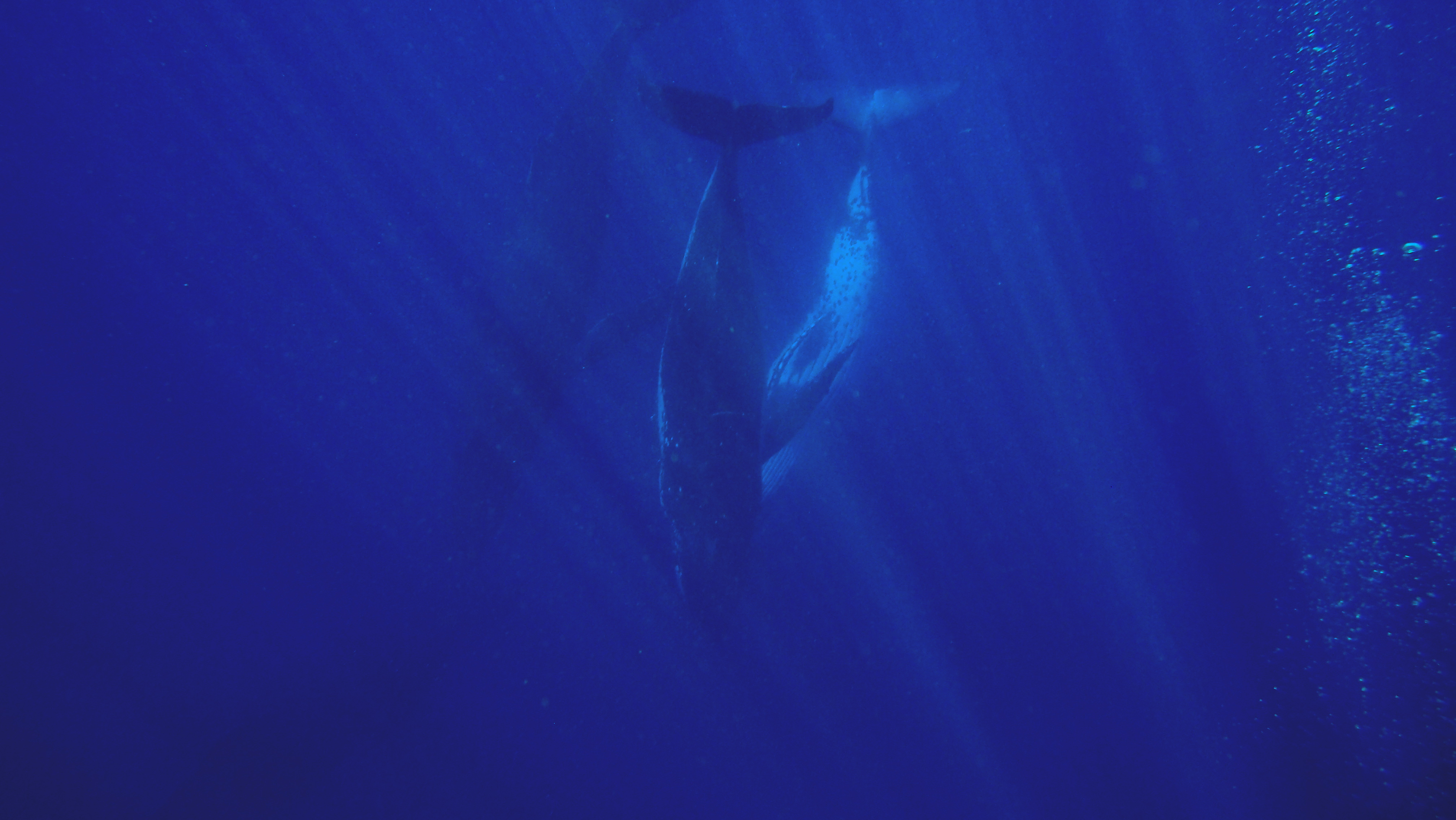
Humpback whales in Vavaʻu, Tonga

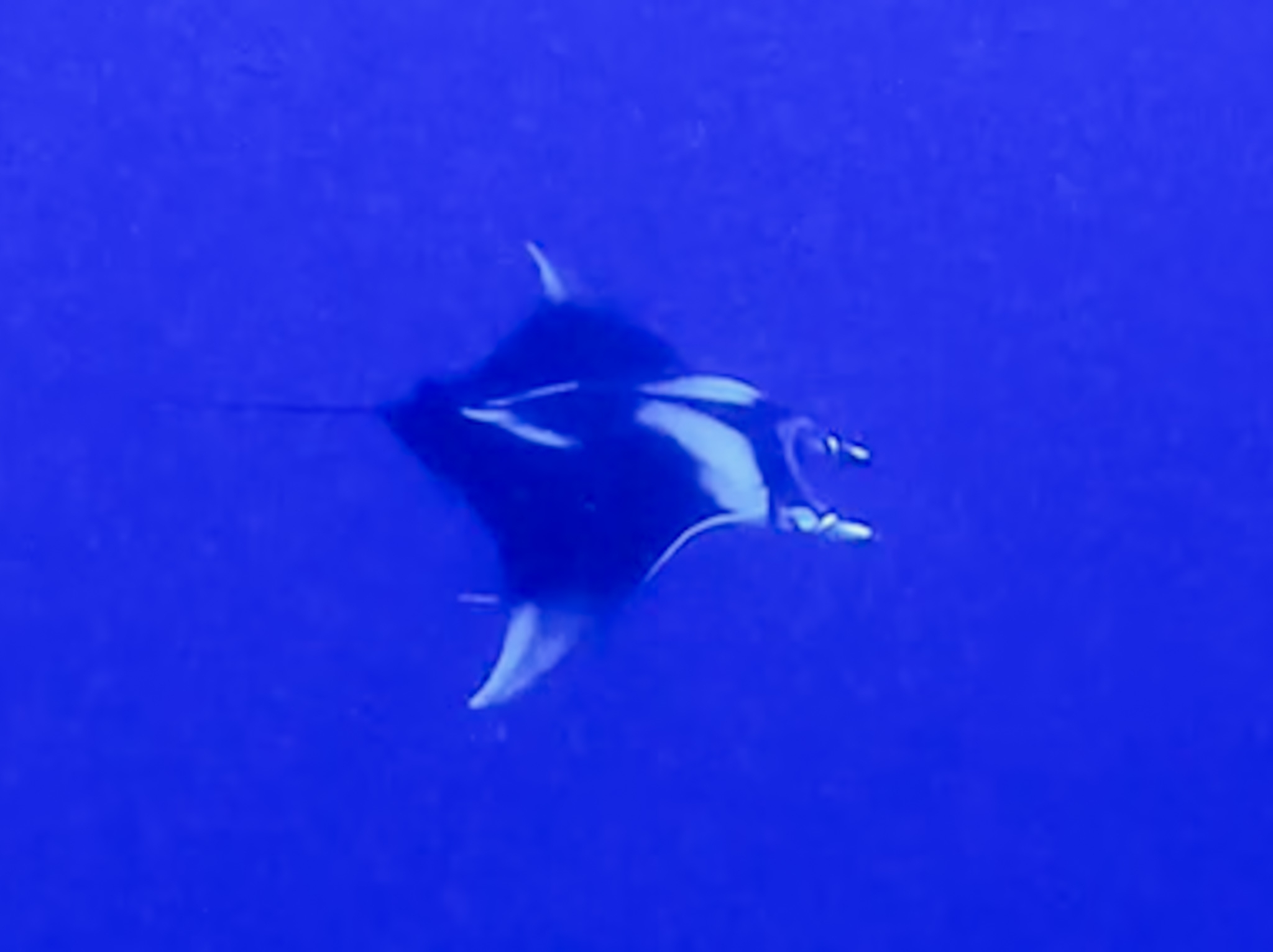
A Giant oceanic manta ray (Mobula birostris), the subject of collaborative research in Aotearoa New Zealand waters

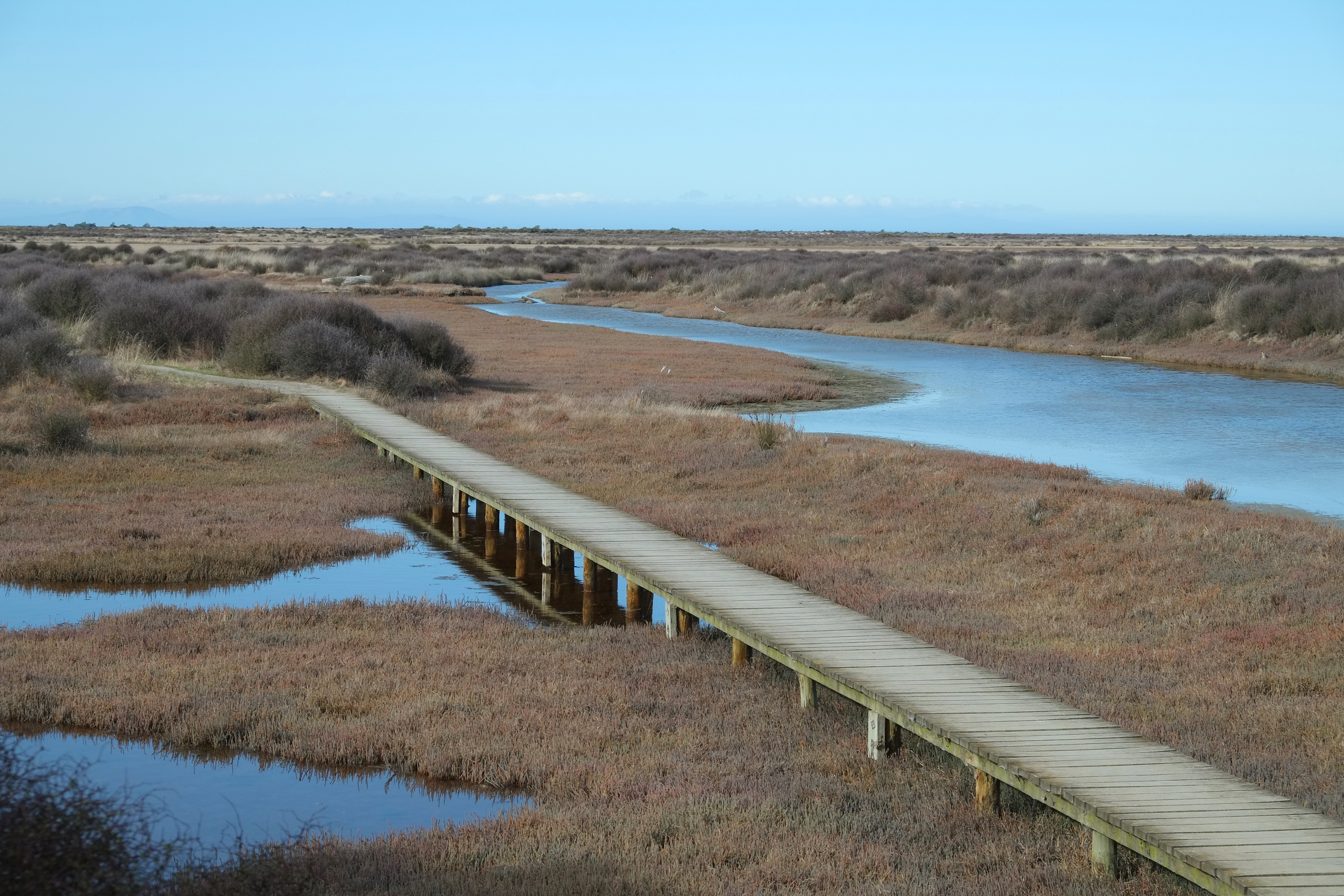
Saltmarsh wetland at Wairau Lagoons, Te Tauihu

== Partnerships ==
Recurring public and science relationships have included work with the Ministry for the Environment on coastal wetland blue-carbon policy research, with the Department of Conservation on manta-ray research, and with Ministry of Foreign Affairs and Trade-supported Pacific fieldwork such as the Tokelau rapid assessment expedition. Research and science collaborations have also involved Manta Watch NZ, New Zealand Geographic, the University of Auckland and Tindale Marine Research Charitable Trust.

At iwi, community and Pacific level, recurring partners have included Ngāti Kurī in early Hinemoana Halo engagement, Te Whānau a Apanui and the Tongan Voyaging Society in the 2024 Hinemoana II voyage, and the Pacific Indigenous groups involved in Hinemoana Halo. In Tokelau, the 2025 fieldwork also involved consultations and citizen-science training with communities across Atafu, Nukunonu and Fakaofo.

== Funding and conservation finance ==
Government-commissioned policy research on coastal wetland blue carbon concluded that blue carbon projects in Aotearoa New Zealand were more likely to be scalable and financially feasible in a voluntary carbon market than within the domestic New Zealand Emissions Trading Scheme. The same work assessed possible financing pathways through grants, bonds, philanthropy and carbon markets, and recommended clearer policy settings for voluntary markets and for international trading under Article 6 of the Paris Agreement.

The policy research also emphasised that any future blue-carbon finance framework would require clearer carbon-rights tools, especially in the coastal marine area, and stronger partnership between government and Māori under Te Tiriti o Waitangi. It identified uncertainty over carbon rights below mean high water springs, and the lack of clear co-management and equitable benefit-sharing mechanisms for iwi communities, as major barriers to project development.

Separate from that policy-design work, publicly announced funding milestones around Hinemoana Halo included a reported $4 million secured in 2023 to design the initiative and seek finance for participating iwi. Later in 2023, a reported US$50 million investment was announced at COP28 toward a stated US$100 million goal. Related advocacy described the Hinemoana Halo Ocean Fund as seeking to raise $100 million through a blue bond for Indigenous-led blue habitat restoration and trophic rewilding projects, while Ngāti Kurī described the initiative as developing natural assets for carbon and biodiversity credits within a blue-economy framework. These funding announcements were presented as fundraising and finance proposals rather than as fully implemented, operating finance mechanisms.

== Impact and evaluation ==
Government-commissioned policy research on coastal wetland blue carbon provided the clearest evaluative findings for the programme's work in Aotearoa New Zealand. It concluded that scaling blue-carbon projects would require clearer carbon-rights arrangements, stronger partnership with Māori, and better enabling conditions for voluntary carbon markets, while also identifying major legal and governance constraints around benefit-sharing and the coastal marine area.

The 2025 Tokelau expedition generated field observations and community-level baseline information on coral-reef condition, ocean management and environmental education across Atafu, Nukunonu and Fakaofo. Reporting on the expedition said the reefs showed signs of recovery after earlier bleaching, while the associated consultations and citizen-science training contributed to local assessment and monitoring capacity.

Collaborative manta-ray research in Aotearoa New Zealand also produced measurable conservation-assessment outputs. In 2025 the oceanic manta ray was reclassified from Data Deficient to Threatened – Nationally Vulnerable, and the national assessment reported 28 satellite-tagged individuals and more than 200 photo-identified manta rays since 2019, helping to improve the evidence base for conservation status and management.
