= Gifford H. Miller =

American paleoclimatologist

- Born: Michigan

Academic background
- Education: BS, 1970, PhD, 1975, University of Colorado Boulder
- Thesis: Glacial and climatic history of northern Cumberland Peninsula, Baffin Island, Canada, during the last 10,000 years (1975)

Gifford H. Miller is an American paleoclimatologist. He is a Distinguished Professor in the Institute of Arctic and Alpine Research at the University of Colorado Boulder.

== Early life and education ==
Miller was born into an academic family as his father, Robert, worked at the University of Michigan and specialized in the endemic fish populations of the western US. He enrolled at the University of Michigan (Ann Arbor) and Albion College for his undergraduate degree but left after his sophomore year to join the Volunteers in Service to America program in western Alaska. Miller eventually enrolled at the University of Colorado Boulder where he planned to major in social sciences but switched to geology after being taught by William C Bradley and meeting geologist John T. Andrews. While completing his PhD, Miller made some of the earliest observations on the application of lichenometry to estimate the ages of Neoglacial moraines.

== Career ==
Following his PhD, Miller completed a postdoctoral fellowship with PE Hare at the Geophysical Laboratory, Washington D.C., then returned to CU Boulder and the Institute of Arctic and Alpine Research. He is a Fellow of the Geological Society of America's Division of Quaternary Geology and Geomorphology. In the 1990s, Miller served as an associate professor and department chair of CUBoulder's Department of Geological Sciences. In this role, he collaborated with Montreal researcher Anne de Vernal to study the impact of global warming on the Northern Hemisphere's ice sheets. He was also the chief author on a study indicating Australia's interior cooled by more than 16 degrees Fahrenheit during the last ice age. As a result of his research, Miller received a 2005–06 Faculty Fellowship, which he used to study Elephant Bird (Aepyornis) extinction and environmental change in Madagascar. During his fellowship, Miller also received the 2005 Easterbrook Distinguished Scientist Award as an "individual who has shown unusual excellence in published research."

Through his studies, which were based on lake-bed sediments, Miller was able to collect valuable data on the Arctic's environmental changes. This resulted in a 2008 study revealed that the ice caps on Canada's Baffin Island have shrunk by over 50% due to the warming temperatures. Miller was later tapped as an expert to give his perspective on the discovery of pristine skeletal remains of Pleistocene megafauna in remote Australian limestone caves. Although he did not participate in the study itself, he provided commentary for Bone Diggers, a NOVA documentary on the discovery. In 2008, Miller was elected a Member of the Norwegian Academy of Science and Letters. The following year, he was elected a Fellow of the American Geophysical Union for his "pioneering work in dating methods as well as his insights into the Quaternary climates and the role of humans in ecological change."

In 2018, Miller was the recipient of the 2018 Distinguished Career Award from the American Quaternary Association as a scientist who has contributed significantly and continuously to the advancement of Quaternary science. In November 2021, Miller was appointed to the rank of Distinguished Professor in the Department of Geological Sciences and the Institute of Arctic and Alpine Research.
