= 1978 Special Honours (New Zealand) =

Awards list for New Zealand

The 1978 Special Honours in New Zealand were two Special Honours Lists: in the first, dated 11 February 1978, two judges received knighthoods; and in the second, dated 20 April 1978, six people were awarded the Polar Medal, for good services as members of New Zealand expeditions to Antarctica in recent years.

== Order of the British Empire ==
=== Knight Grand Cross (GBE) ===
Civil division

- The Honourable Ronald Keith Davison CMG – of Auckland; Chief Justice of New Zealand.
- The Right Honourable Sir Herbert Richard Churton Wild KCMG ED – of Wellington; lately Chief Justice of New Zealand.

== Polar Medal ==
- Major James Richard Millton Barker MBE RNZIR (Rtd) – of Christchurch; officer-in-charge, 1970–1972.
- Peter John Barrett — of Wellington; geologist, 1974–1975.
- Anthony Maurice Bromley — of Christchurch; meteorological observer and station leader, 1973–1974.
- Jack Edward Hoffman — of Lower Hutt; driller, 1975–1976.
- Malcolm Gordon Laird — of Christchurch; geologist and field leader, 1974–1975.
- Alexander Thomas Wilson — of Hamilton; geochemist, 1974–1975.
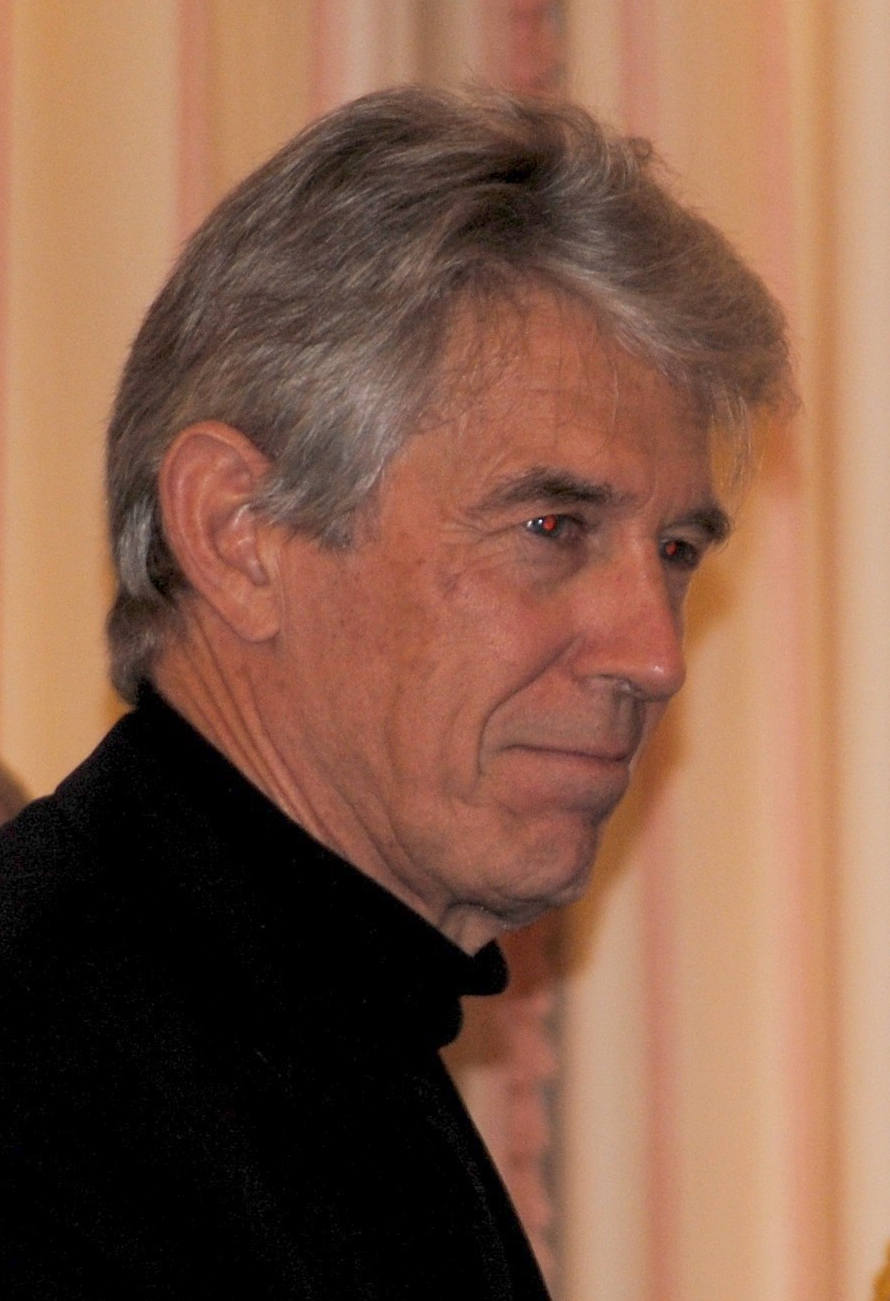
Peter Barrett
