= New Zealand Antarctic Medal =

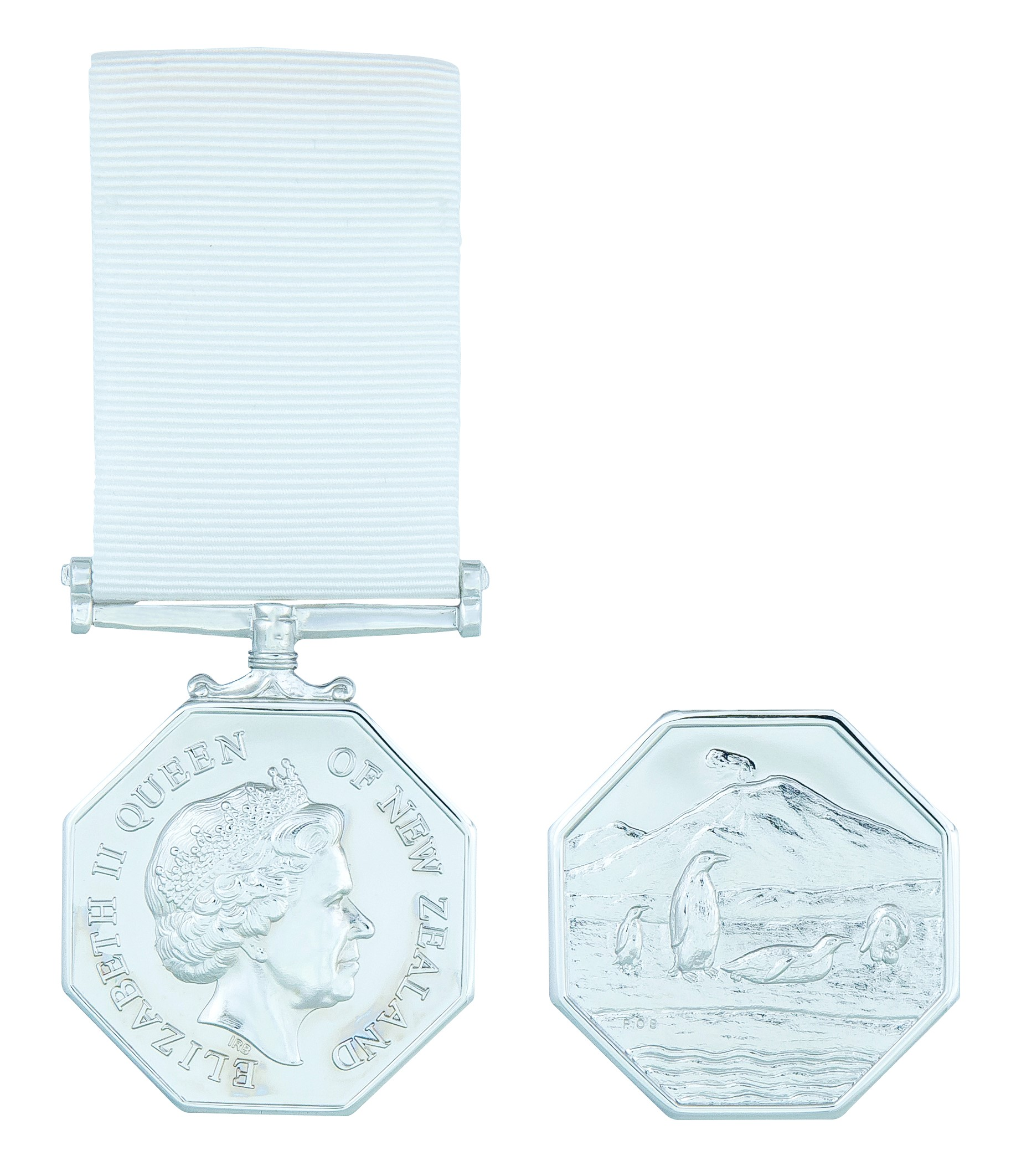
- Obverse and reverse of the medal
- Type: Medal
- Description: (Obverse) An effigy of Queen Elizabeth II designed by Ian Rank-Broadley with the inscription "Elizabeth II Queen of New Zealand"; (reverse) four emperor penguins on an Antarctic landscape with Mount Erebus in the background.
- Presented by: New Zealand
- Eligibility: for outstanding contribution to exploration, scientific research, conservation, environmental protection, or knowledge of the Antarctic region; or in support of New Zealand’s objectives or operations, or both, in the Antarctic region.
- Post-nominals: NZAM
- Status: Currently awarded
- Established: 1 September 2006
- First award: 30 December 2006
- Latest award: 1 June 2026

Highlights
- Total: 22 as of 1 June 2026
- Total awarded posthumously: 1
- Ribbon bar of the medal

Precedence
- Next (higher): King's Service Medal (KSM)
- Next (lower): New Zealand Distinguished Service Decoration (DSD)
- Related: Polar Medal

The New Zealand Antarctic Medal was created 1 September 2006, as a New Zealand royal honour to replace the British Polar Medal.

== History ==
The Polar Medal was instituted in 1904 and awarded to those who had made notable contributions to the exploration and knowledge of polar regions and who, in doing so, had undergone the hazards and rigors imposed by the polar environment to life and movement, whether by land, sea or air.

In 1995, the Prime Minister's Honours Advisory Committee recommended that the Polar Medal should be created under a New Zealand royal warrant. It also recommended that it should be renamed as "The Antarctic Medal" to reflect the fact that it is in relation to Antarctica that New Zealand's endeavors and achievements have been made. The New Zealand Antarctic Medal was formally instituted by Queen Elizabeth II on 1 September 2006.

== Eligibility ==
The New Zealand Antarctic Medal may be awarded to those New Zealanders and other persons who either individually or as members of a New Zealand mission in the Antarctic region have made an outstanding contribution to exploration, scientific research, conservation, environmental protection, or knowledge of the Antarctic region; or in support of New Zealand’s objectives or operations, or both, in the Antarctic region. The Medal will not be awarded for acts of bravery, for short-term acts of extreme endurance, for long service or for service in Antarctica generally.

== Recipients ==
As of June 2026, 21 awards and one honorary award have been issued. All recipients are entitled to the post-nominal letters NZAM.

	Name	Portrait	Date awarded
1	John Bradshaw; NZAM		30 December 2006
2	Clive Howard-Williams; NZAM		30 December 2006
3	Karl Erb (Note: Honorary); NZAM		30 December 2006
4	Fred Davey; NZAM		4 June 2007
5	Timothy Haskell; NZAM		31 December 2007
6	Peter Barrett; NZAM		31 December 2009
7	David Harrowfield; NZAM		31 December 2009
8	Tim Naish; NZAM		31 December 2009
9	Alex Pyne; NZAM		31 December 2009
10	Allan Green; NZAM		3 June 2013
11	Baden Norris; QSO NZAM		3 June 2013
12	Lou Sanson; QSO NZAM		31 December 2014
13	Randal Heke; NZAM		5 June 2017
14	Pat Langhorne; NZAM		31 December 2018
15	Andrew Leachman (Note: Posthumous award, died 16 September 2017); NZAM		31 December 2018
16	Brian Fitzgerald; NZAM		31 December 2020
17	Ian Hawes; NZAM		6 June 2022
18	Nigel Watson; NZAM		31 December 2022
19	Megan Balks; NZAM		30 December 2023
20	Al Fastier; NZAM		31 December 2024
21	Colin Monteath; QSM NZAM		31 December 2024
22	Alan Hemmings; NZAM		1 June 2026

== See also ==
- New Zealand Honours System
- Polar Medal
