= Department of Conservation (New Zealand) =

New Zealand government agency

- Māori: Te Papa Atawhai

Agency overview
- Formed: 1 April 1987; 39 years ago
- Jurisdiction: New Zealand
- Headquarters: Conservation House, 18–32 Manners Street, Wellington 6011
- Employees: 2,413 FTE staff (30 June 2020)
- Annual budget: Total budget for 2019/20 ▲$600,588,000
- Minister responsible: Hon Tama Potaka, Minister of Conservation
- Agency executive: Peter Chrisp, Director-General
- Website: doc.govt.nz

The Department of Conservation (DOC; Māori: Te Papa Atawhai) is the public service department of New Zealand charged with the conservation of New Zealand's natural and historical heritage.

An advisory body, the New Zealand Conservation Authority (NZCA) is provided to advise DOC and its ministers. In addition there are 15 conservation boards for different areas around the country that provide for interaction between DOC and the public.

== Functions and history ==
=== Overview ===
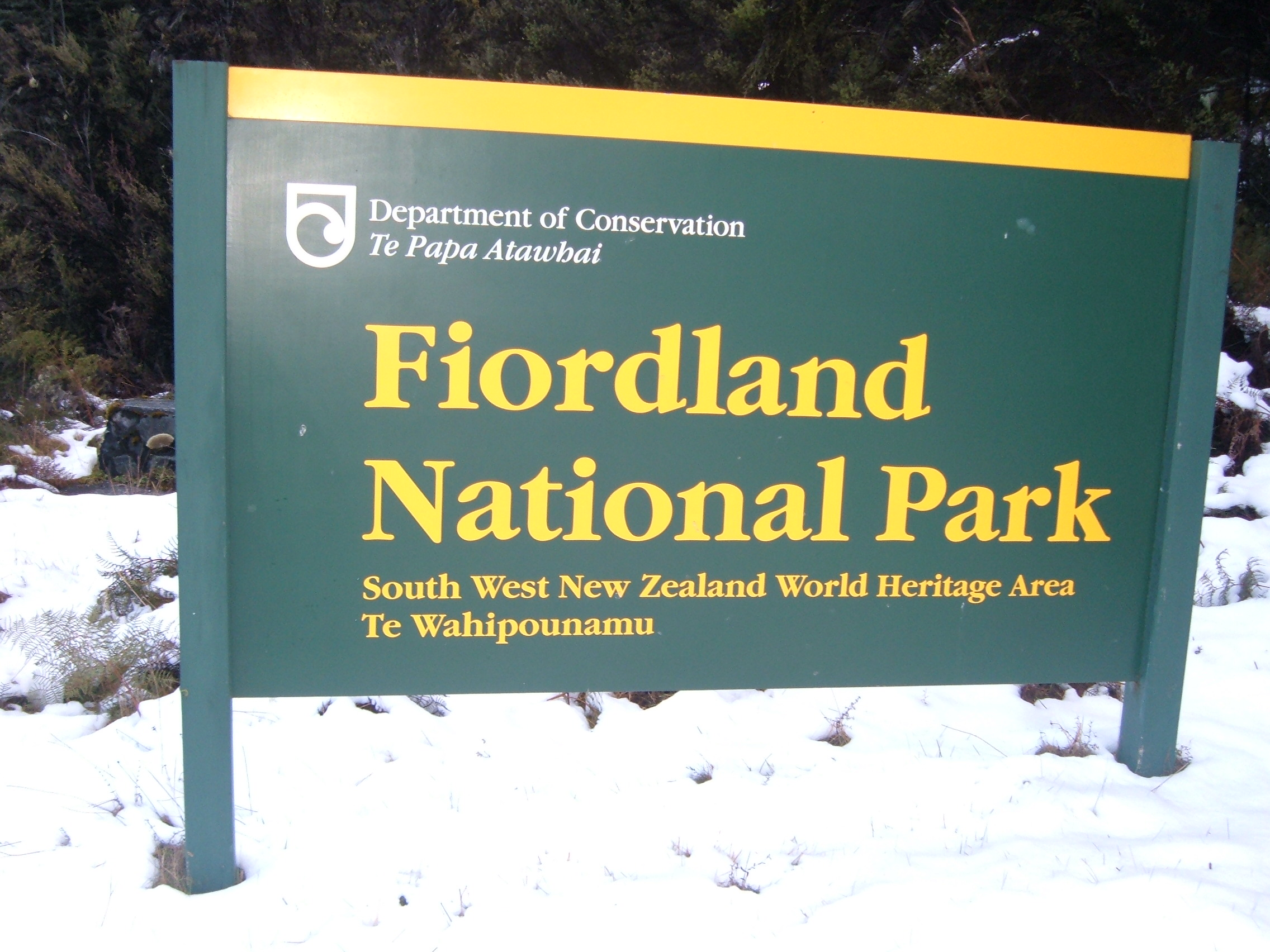
DOC signs of this format are commonly seen around New Zealand conservation areas.

DOC operates much of the backcountry tourist infrastructure of the country, such as this overnight hut on the Rakiura Track.

The department was formed on 1 April 1987, as one of several reforms of the public service, when the Conservation Act 1987 was passed to integrate some functions of the Department of Lands and Survey, the Forest Service and the Wildlife Service. This act also set out the majority of the department's responsibilities and roles.

As a consequence of Conservation Act all Crown land in New Zealand designated for conservation and protection became managed by the Department of Conservation. This is about 30% of New Zealand's land area or about 8 million hectares of native forests, tussocklands, alpine areas, wetlands, dunelands, estuaries, lakes and islands, national forests, maritime parks, marine reserves, nearly 4000 reserves, river margins, some coastline, and many offshore islands. All of the land under its control is protected for either conservation, ecological, scenic, scientific, historic or cultural reasons, and for recreation.

Providing for recreation is a major part of its core work, and this covers the management of family picnic sites, as well as maintaining rugged backcountry tracks and over 1000 accompanying backcountry huts that are used by hunters and recreational trampers. DOC also administers the Nature Heritage Fund, and is responsible for supporting rural fire control by acting under the direction of Fire and Emergency New Zealand when a fire occurs on land it manages. Up until June 2017, DOC was the designated fire authority for all land under its control.

In addition to its work managing land and providing for recreation in New Zealand, DOC works to preserve its natural heritage. This includes preservation of historic sites on public conservation land, saving native threatened species, managing threats like pests and weeds, environmental restoration, caring for marine life, and assisting landowners to effectively preserve natural heritage.

In 2025, Predator Free 2050 Ltd transferred its projects and long-term predator-control responsibilities to the Department of Conservation, with DOC committing to a professional and seamless transition of the programme's work.

The methods of achieving these goals have resulted in controversy, where some people claim that the Department of Conservation is overly biased towards environmentalists at the expense of New Zealand's economy. This is particularly a concern amongst some farmers and other industries that are major users of neighbouring land, many of whom have been affected by decisions of the department. However, these criticised DOC efforts have also been lauded for achieving some success, for both conservationists and farmers, having led to a significant drop in possum populations during the last decades.

The DOC was floated as the agency to supervise the construction of the proposed New Zealand Cycleway, though this is now being managed primarily by the Ministry of Tourism, in coordination with the DOC where appropriate.

As part of New Zealand's programme of economic recovery post the peak of the Covid-19 pandemic and the following economic downturn DOC is working alongside the Ministry for the Environment, Department of Conservation, Ministry for Primary Industries, Land Information New Zealand and Ministry of Business Innovation and Employment to fund a number of temporary projects with the objective of creating jobs and assisting New Zealand's efforts to further protect the environment. As of June 2023 the project, entitled "Jobs For Nature", has employed 4,694 individuals over 193 projects. The programme's investment is estimated to be worth approximately NZ$1.19Billion, with the projects undertaken focused on providing temporary employment as well benefit the environment, people, and regional New Zealand.

In December 2025, the Department partnered with Manta Watch NZ and Conservation International Aotearoa on work related to oceanic manta ray research and reporting in New Zealand waters.

=== Headquarters ===
The Department of Conservation moved into a new headquarters, Conservation House, on Manners Street, Wellington in 2006. It is the first green building in New Zealand to be given a 5-star rating, having won numerous environmental awards, including a top 10 placing by Grist Magazine. The site was originally a cinema complex operated by the Hoyts Group from the mid-1980s until the early 2000s, when it closed down in the face of stiff competition.

== Conservation land ==
New Zealand has 13 national parks, and a wide number of other conservation lands with varying levels of environmental protection, called the "conservation estate" in total. About one third of this estate, generally the land considered most valuable, has been protected from mining since 1997 via being listed in Schedule 4 of the Crown Minerals Act 1991 (though the Fifth National Government in 2010 proposed exempting some areas from Schedule 4).

While much of the conservation land not protected as national parks or Schedule 4 land is much more damaged or human-modified than the core conservation areas, these areas serve as boundary and species buffer zones.

== Incidents and issues ==
=== Cave Creek disaster ===
In 1995, 14 people died when a viewing platform maintained by the Department of Conservation collapsed. Immediately following the tragedy, all of the department's 106 viewing platforms throughout New Zealand were checked. Fifteen platforms were closed for repairs.

A Commission of Inquiry that followed the tragedy revealed that the department had acted illegally and negligently in constructing the viewing platform. The commission also stated that the department was seriously underfunded for the tasks with which it was delegated, resulting in a culture of sub-standard safety procedures having been used for the building and maintenance of some of its facilities.

Many people in New Zealand criticised the government for the department's situation, and Denis Marshall, the presiding Minister of Conservation at the time, eventually resigned over the incident. Since the inquiry, radical changes have been made to the department's procedures to prioritise safety, including the implementation of a comprehensive asset management system to catalogue, track and trigger regular inspections of all significant structures and facilities managed by the department.

=== Raoul Island eruption ===
In March 2006, a volcanic eruption at the Green Lake of Raoul Island, administered by the Department of Conservation, was believed to have killed DOC worker Mark Kearney. At the exact time of the eruption, Kearney is thought to have been taking temperature measurements of the lake as part of a programme for monitoring volcanic activity. Five other DOC workers, who were also living on the island, were forced to evacuate back to New Zealand shortly after the eruption. Searches for Kearney, which have been inhibited by the island's remote location and the risks of further volcanic activity, have since failed to find any signs of him.

=== Job cuts ===
After a number of years of falling budgets, in 2013 the department announced it would be cutting 140 jobs and narrowing its 11-region structure into six.

In April 2024, the department proposed cutting 130 roles as part of efforts to meet Government budget spending cut targets of 6.5%. In addition, DOC must also find NZ$7.2 million to meet cost operating pressures. The proposed job cuts include 24 "Biodiversity, Heritage & Visitors" roles, 22 Policy & Regulatory services roles, 18 public affairs roles and 54 Regional Operations support roles.

In late May 2025, the department proposed cutting another 84 jobs to meet a Government directive for a 6.5 percent reduction in spending. In late July 2025, the department confirmed that it would disestablish 143 administrative and assistant roles, and create 72 new roles; resulting in the loss of 71 net jobs.

== List of directors-general ==
Directors-General of DOC (Chief Executive) are:

No.	Name	Portrait	Term of office	
1	Ken Piddington		April 1987	March 1988
-	Peter Bygate acting		March 1988	August 1988
2	David McDowell		August 1988	October 1989
-	Peter Bygate acting		November 1989	February 1990
3	Bill Mansfield		February 1990	May 1997
4	Hugh Logan		May 1997	May 2006
5	Al Morrison		November 2006	September 2013
6	Lou Sanson		September 2013	September 2021
-	Bruce Parkes acting		September 2021	November 2021
7	Penny Nelson		November 2021	present

== National Predator Control Programme ==
The National Predator Control Programme (NPCP), led by New Zealand’s Department of Conservation (DOC), is a large-scale biodiversity initiative aimed at protecting native wildlife by controlling populations of invasive predators. Covering nearly 1.8 million hectares of conservation land, the programme plays a critical role in preserving vulnerable species such as kiwi, kea, whio (blue duck), kōkako, bats, frogs, lizards, and rock wren.

Predators such as rats, stoats, and possums pose significant threats to native species, especially during mast years when increased food supplies lead to rapid predator population booms. The NPCP responds proactively to these ecological events, using a combination of aerial 1080 application, ground trapping, and continuous monitoring. Site selection is based on national conservation priorities and extensive consultation, and operations are carefully timed around breeding seasons and local conditions to maximise impact while minimising risk.

The programme has delivered remarkable conservation outcomes. For instance, in the Heaphy Valley in Kahurangi National Park, nine native bird species showed notable increases between 2015 and 2019. In South Westland’s Landsborough Valley, over 20 years of predator control has led to flourishing bird populations. In 2024 alone, conservationists observed a dramatic improvement in the survival of Fiordland tokoeka chicks—from zero survival without control to approximately 60% survival following predator suppression. Similarly, kākā in Pureora Forest now show a balanced 1:1 sex ratio, a milestone not previously recorded.

The NPCP is a cornerstone of New Zealand’s Predator Free 2050 vision, providing vital protection for native ecosystems while long-term predator eradication technologies continue to be developed. It reflects DOC’s commitment to safeguarding Aotearoa’s unique biodiversity through science-based, collaborative, and adaptive management.

== See also ==
- Biodiversity of New Zealand
- Conservation in New Zealand
- National parks of New Zealand
- Forest parks of New Zealand
- New Zealand Great Walks
- Regional parks of New Zealand
- Tramping in New Zealand
- National Council for Fire & Emergency Services
- 1080 usage in New Zealand, of which DOC is one of the largest users.
