= Lou Sanson =

New Zealand conservation administrator

Lou Sanson QSO NZAM
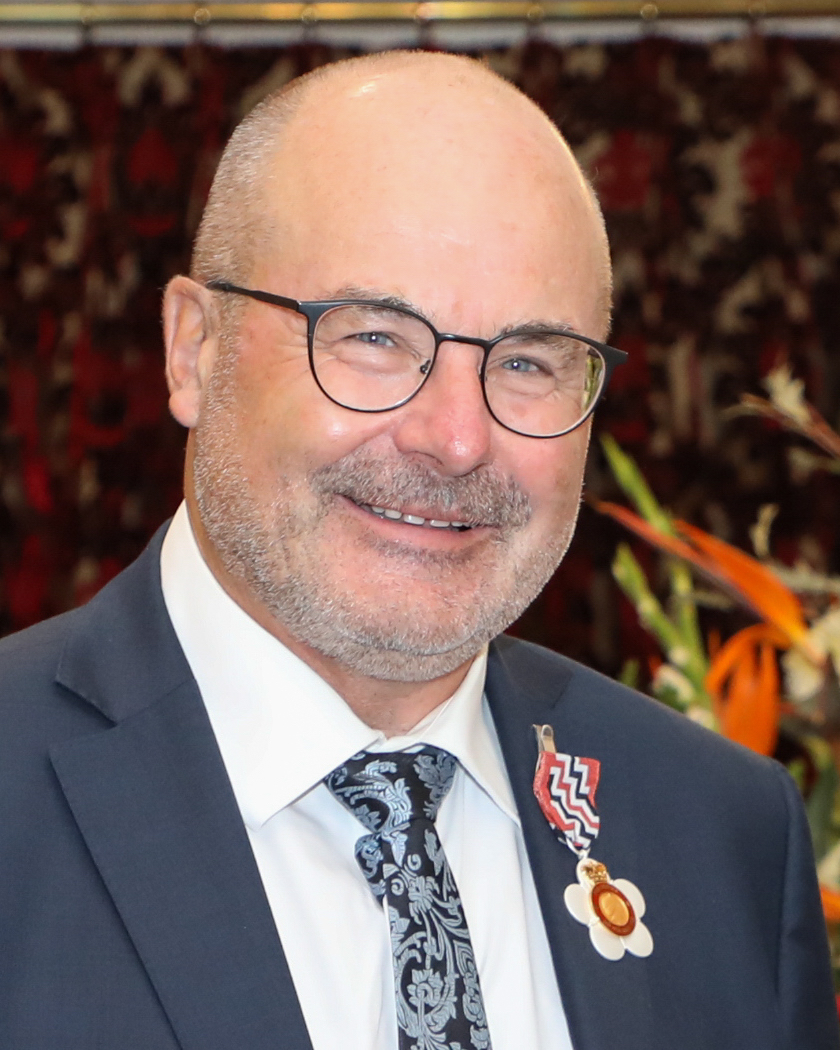
- Sanson in 2022

6th Director-General of Conservation
- In office September 2013 – September 2021
- Preceded by: Al Morrison
- Succeeded by: Penny Nelson

Personal details
- Born: Lewis Vernon Sanson; 1957 (age 68–69) Hokitika, New Zealand
- Education: University of Canterbury
- Occupation: Public servant

Lewis Vernon Sanson QSO NZAM (born 1957) is the former director of the New Zealand Department of Conservation.

== Early life ==
Sanson was born in Hokitika on the West Coast of the South Island in 1957. He attended Hokitika Primary School and Westland High School. His parents were both teachers at Westland High School: his mother Alison taught art and his father Trevor mathematics. Sanson's father, who died in 2003, was an engineer who spent a year in the 1960s supervising studies in Antarctica, to which Sanson attributes his early interest in the continent. Growing up in the West Coast was the source of his "love of conservation and the natural environment"; his mother first took him to the mountains at the age of five. As a teenager he regularly explored the forests of South Westland, staying in forestry huts. He was part of a Westland High School environmental group who in 1971 stopped native forest logging by the New Zealand Forest Service in the Hokitika Gorge.

== Career ==
Sanson's first paid job was for the Forest Service in 1971, at the age of 17, as a track cutter in the Copland Valley, now Westland Tai Poutini National Park. He then completed a Bachelor of Forestry degree at the University of Canterbury, with a thesis on wilding pine in the Abel Tasman National Park. For two years, he was an environmental forester in the Forest Research Institute, followed by work in pest control and forest surveying, eventually becoming District Forester in Southland. Based in Invercargill, he stayed there for 22 years. After the Department of Conservation (DOC) was formed in 1987, he took up the position of Southland Conservator (a managerial role), aged just 30.

Sanson made the first of around 50 trips to Antarctica in 1981, spending five months working as a field assistant. From 2002 to 2013, Sanson was based in Christchurch as the chief executive of Antarctica New Zealand, a post he admitted he held onto "a little too long", while waiting for the top role at the Department of Conservation to become available. He assisted with the formation of the McMurdo Dry Valleys Protected Area and the Ross Sea Region Marine Protected Area, in 2007 took Sir Edmund Hillary on his last visit to Antarctica, and helped set up the New Zealand Antarctic Research Institute in 2012. In November 2013, he was appointed chief executive and director-general of conservation for DOC.

Sanson arrived at DOC at a time when repeated budget cuts had created an unsafe work culture, culminating in the Cave Creek disaster. During his time at DOC, Sanson expanded commercial partnerships and sometimes-controversial sponsorship arrangements with companies like Fonterra and Air New Zealand. He oversaw the creation of Rakiura National Park and the Sub-Antarctic Islands World Heritage Area, the launch of the Predator Free 2050 strategy, and the rat eradication on Campbell Island. Sanson was the Crown negotiator for the Ngāi Tahu Deed Settlement Act on the Tītī Islands and Whenua Hou Settlements. During his tenure DOC saw significant funding increases: $76m for tourism infrastructure and predator control in 2017, $181m for biodiversity from the newly elected Labour government, and the $500m Jobs for Nature COVID-19 recovery scheme. After two three-year terms and an extension of two years, he retired in September 2021. Sanson planned to volunteer for Predator Free 2050 and the Backcountry Trust (which maintains tramping huts).

When leaving his role at DOC, it paid over $5,000 on leaving presents for Sanson. The expense was criticised by the Taxpayers' Union and Sanson had suggested returning the presents after learning the value and that DOC had paid for them. He thought they had been bought by staff and ministers.

== Honours ==
In the 2015 New Year Honours, Sanson was awarded the New Zealand Antarctic Medal for his services to Antarctic science and conservation. In the 2022 New Year Honours, he was appointed a Companion of the Queen's Service Order, for services to conservation and public service.

== Personal life ==
Sanson and his wife Jan have two daughters. After Sanson's retirement, the couple moved in December 2021 from their Miramar, Wellington home to Wānaka.
