= Tim Naish =

New Zealand scientist (born 1951)

Tim Naish NZAM
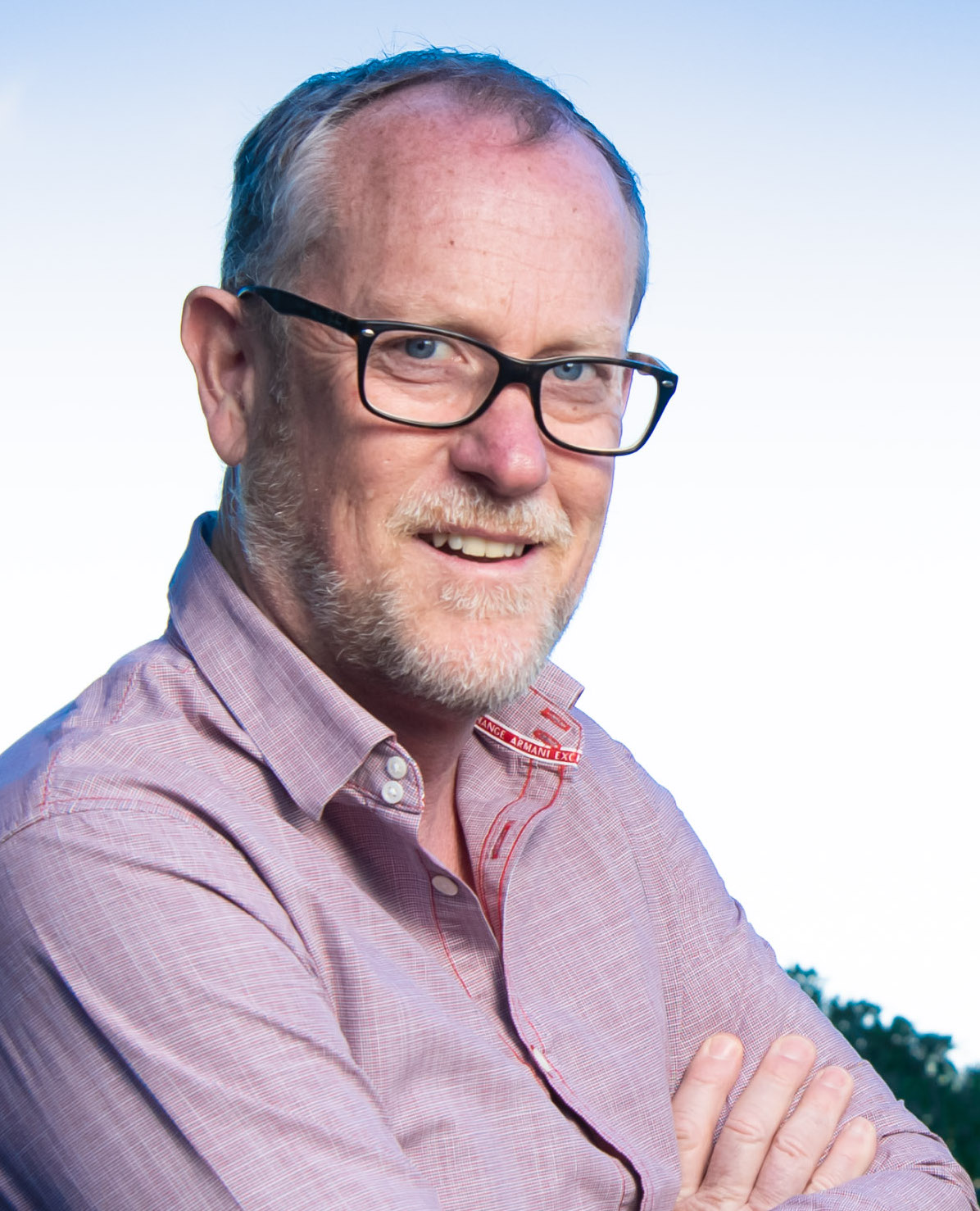
- Born: Timothy Raymond Naish; 1966 (age 59–60)
- Education: University of Waikato
- Scientific career
- Fields: Glaciology and climate science
- Workplaces: GNS Science; Victoria University Wellington
- Thesis: High-resolution sequence stratigraphy, sedimentology, paleoecology, and chronology of the Pliocene-Pleistocene (c.2.6–1.7 Ma) Rangitikei Group, Wanganui Basin, New Zealand (1996)

Timothy Raymond Naish NZAM is a New Zealand glaciologist and climate scientist who has been a researcher and lecturer at Victoria University of Wellington and the director of the Antarctic Research Centre, and in 2020 became a programme leader at the Antarctic Science Platform. Naish has researched and written about the possible effect of melting ice sheets in Antarctica on global sea levels due to high CO_{2} emissions causing warming in the Southern Ocean. He was instrumental in establishing and leading the Antarctica Drilling Project (ANDRILL), and a Lead Author on the Intergovernmental Panel on Climate Change (IPCC) 5th Assessment Report (2014).

== Education and career ==
Naish initially studied engineering at Waikato University but moved into earth sciences and gained skills in geological mapping and describing rocks, graduating with a BSc in 1988. He continued to study at Waikato University, completing a master's degree with first class honours in 1990 and after working for while as a geologist with the Department of Scientific and Industrial Research (DSIR) completed his PhD in 1996. He worked as an Assistant Lecturer at University of Waikato, Earth Sciences, New Zealand (1990–1995), completed the Australian Research Council Post-Doctoral Fellowship, James Cook University of Northern Queensland (1996–1997) and was researcher and principal scientist at GNS Science, Lower Hutt New Zealand (1998–2016). Qualified as a professor in earth sciences, Naish was director of the Antarctic Research Centre at Victoria University of Wellington from 2008 until 2017, when he took up a Royal Society of New Zealand James Cook Fellowship. He joined the leadership team of The Antarctic Science Platform in 2019. As of 2023, Naish is a member of the joint scientific committee of the World Climate Research Programme (WCRP) and co-leads an international research programme investigating Instabilities and Thresholds in Antarctica (INSTANT) for the Scientific Committee on Antarctic Research (SCAR).

== Research ==
Research by Naish focuses on past, present and future climate with specific emphasis on how the Antarctic ice sheets respond to climate change and influence global sea-levels. Early work in this area began while he was completing his PhD in 1996 and became interested in a project in Whanganui, New Zealand that was exploring how sedimentary rocks could show the history of two and a half million years of changes in the sea level. Naish coordinated research on the Whanganui Basin in 1995, 1996, and 1997 with each of these projects contributing to the understanding of the Plio-Pleistocene boundary by collecting data on shelf deposits of sediment in the Whanganui Basin that showed recurring global changes in sea levels. In September and October of 1999, Naish led a team that drilled deep holes in the Basin with the aim of confirming that "the Wanganui succession is gaining a reputation as one of the most complete shallow marine records of late Neogene sea level and climatic change in the world". Discussing a research project led by Professor Ken Miller, of Rutgers University, with which he was involved in 2012, Naish said that "Whanganui holds one of the world's best geological archives of global sea-level during the warm climate of the Pliocene and is a key data set in this new study...[and]...it is the window into the future and it just so happens the window is mostly open in New Zealand". In the same article, Naish reflected that he had gone "the full circle" having seen the evidence in New Zealand and Whanganui and then seeing the evidence that the ice sheet had actually collapsed.

Naish and a team returned to the Whanganui Basin in 2014 to drill 500 metres into the layers of sediment. The aim was to reduce the uncertainty of a previous estimate that sea levels were 20 metres higher in the Pliocene period - a time when the world had about the same amount of greenhouse gases such as CO_{2} as in the 21st century and was a few degrees warmer. This was important because understanding historical changes in global sea levels links to Antarctica's ice sheets and their vulnerability to melting. In 2019 Naish worked with Gavin Dunbar of the Antarctic Research Centre and Georgia Grant, a recent Victoria University of Wellington PhD graduate now at GNS Science. They used a new method of analysing marine geological sediment archived from the previous Whanganui Basin research and were able to show that "during the past warm period of the Pliocene about three million years ago, global sea levels regularly fluctuated between 5 to 25 metres". According to Grant, it was concerning because a high percentage of the heat from global warming had gone into the Southern Ocean which surrounds the Antarctic ice sheet, making the sheet vulnerable to widespread and catastrophic collapse from ocean heating. It was noted that the ice sheet had melted in the past when CO_{2} levels were the same as 2019.

Naish contributed to the guide document setting up The ANDRILL McMurdo Ice Shelf Project (2006). The prospectus for this project, co-authored by Naish, explained its goal was to gather geological data to determine past ice shelf responses to climate warming by drilling a stratigraphic hole from the Ross Ice Shelf to gather the body of accumulated sediment for analysis and record ocean temperatures. Early in its work in 2006, the project established what had happened to this sediment historically and how in the natural cycles at the time, CO_{2} levels were significantly lower than in the modern era. The project was aiming to date the sediments to identify just when the ice disappeared and link this back to the climate of the time.

In 2007 at the European Geosciences Union General Assembly meeting, Naish reported on the progress of ANDRILL, noting the importance of getting data from sediment close to the Antarctic ice sheets that could provide historical information about how the ice interacts with the global climate system. He said that the drilling in 2006 "had successfully retrieved a 1,285m-long core of rock - the longest core drilled anywhere on the Antarctic margin, and a record of past climate conditions that probably spans some 10 million years into the past". This report noted that the research had discovered single-celled algae (fossil diatoms) under the ocean floor, indicating large areas of the ice shelf had retreated, possibly onto the Antarctic landmass. The research team interpreted this to mean that millions of years ago there were times when the climate was very cold and very hot and it was important to ascertain how this had affected the ice sheet, and could provide information to establish how sensitive the ice was to warming and whether this could lead to the collapse of the West Antarctic Ice Sheet (WAIS). David Harwood, from the University of Nebraska–Lincoln, said that the ANDRILL data was an important point of reference for other research on Antarctica and would situate information into a "chronology that is the best continuous record we have to date". In 2007 Naish also co-authored another summary of the achievements of ANDRILL in the project's first year, confirming that the cores contained rocks with historical evidence of climate variations in Antarctica, enabling predictions to be made about how the iced sheets could respond to global warming. Overseas studies conducted on Russian sediment cores, discussed by Julie Brigham-Grette and Steve Petsch from the University of Massachusetts, Amherst in 2020, confirmed that if the CO_{2} emission levels were not reduced globally, the fears of some scientists that the Arctic will be completely ice-free within the next two decades will be realised.

By 2009, Naish was confident the ANDRILL data would show that "Antarctica's ice sheets [had] grown and collapsed at least 40 times over the past five million years...[and]...the findings [were] expected to contribute to significant changes in the fifth assessment of the UN's Intergovernmental Panel of Climate Change (IPCC)".

In 2016 he won a research fellowship in physical science at James Cook University in Australia, to contribute to research entitled: The contribution of the Antarctic ice sheet to past and future sea-level rise and implications for New Zealand.

From 2017, Naish has been group co-leader, Past Antarctic Ice Sheet Dynamics (PAIS) Scientific Committee on Antarctic Research (SCAR), Cambridge, United Kingdom. He explained that the priority of SCAR was to develop research programmes related to environmental change and sustainability and provide "defensible scientific evidence" to the Antarctic Treaty System. This recognition of the importance of a global approach to sustainability was the reason SCAR aimed to work closely with the United Nations Framework Convention on Climate Change (UNFCCC) and provide research studies to the Intergovernmental Panel on Climate Change(IPCC), with two of SCAR's research programmes already having contributed to the IPCC's Fifth Assessment Report.

For the period 2020–2023, as part of The Antarctic Science Platform, Naish was chosen to lead research programmes focussing on the effects of a warming world on the ice-ocean-atmosphere of Antarctica. The project involved drilling projects on the ice sheets and shelves, rock sampling and ocean measurements.

Along with Richard Levy, Naish leads the NZ SeaRise project, a five-year (2018–2023) research programme funded by the Ministry of Business, Innovation and Employment and hosted at Victoria University of Wellington. Naish clarified that the research of NZ SeaRise would result in "maps showing coastline changes, and new information about the frequency of large coastal floods will describe the consequences of sea-level rise for our main coastal cities". When the project presented data in May 2022 that showed the sea levels in New Zealand were rising faster than previously predicted, Naish said he was surprised at how soon parts of Auckland and Wellington would be impacted but that people should not be overwhelmed by the data and there was still time to adapt and make plans to deal with the rise in levels. He did urge however that because parts of Wellington and Auckland were "subsiding at rates of more than 3mm each year...[councils needed to be]... putting in place serious plans for adaptation right now". Speaking to Newsroom Naish explained how this related to the movement of tectonic plates:

Being a New Zealander, we know that the land goes up and the land goes down and we have earthquakes. So we certainly expected that, by the time we put these vertical land movements into the sea level predictions, they would have an effect. But I think we were quite stunned by the magnitude of that effect and how much it really mattered in the very near term, in the coming decades.

Naish noted that sea-level rise depended on climate change initiatives, including limiting global warming to below 2C above pre-industrial levels, and concluded that "the severity with which we will experience sea-level rise, and other impacts of climate change, can be lessened if we do all we can to limit warming by reducing emissions now".

== Awards and honours ==
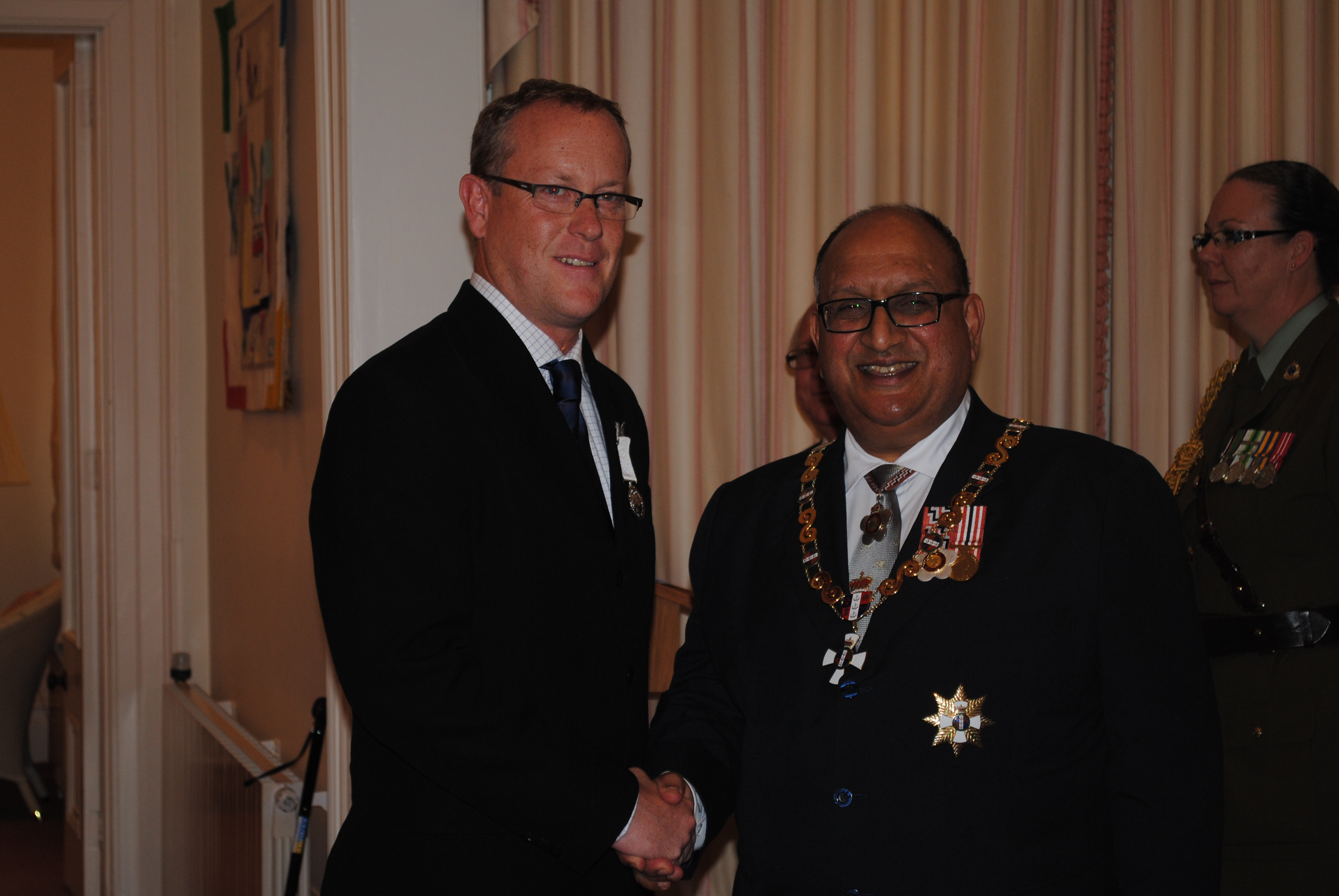
Naish (left), after receiving the New Zealand Antarctic Medal, for services to Antarctic climate science, from the governor-general, Sir Anand Satyanand, on 29 April 2010

In the 2010 New Year Honours, Naish was awarded the New Zealand Antarctic Medal, for services to Antarctic climate science. For his research on Antarctica's response to climate change over time and the role of melting ice sheets on sea levels, he was awarded The Tinker-Muse Prize for Science and Policy in Antarctica in 2014.

On 3 November 2014, Naish was elected as Fellow of the Royal Society of New Zealand. Identified as one of New Zealand's top researchers and scientific scholars, Naish said:

I'm very humbled to receive this recognition; it is a huge honour as a scientist in New Zealand. It's more than a personal thing—research has and always will be collaborative and this award reflects a whole group both nationally and internationally.

Naish was one of a team of geologists, glaciologists and social scientists that won the 2019 Prime Minister's Science Prize for their work on the impact of Antarctica's ice sheets melting on global sea levels. Naish was the team leader and another member, Richard Levy from GNS Science and Victoria University of Wellington credited him with "bringing together scientists and experts to ensure the project's success".

== Public policy positions ==
In 2002, between 31 January and 7 March when the Antarctica's Larsen B ice shelf collapsed and broke up, Naish warned that the ice shelf of Weddell Sea was imperiled, and if the temperature rose by 3°C, the ice shelves of Antarctica could become thinner. In 2009 there was a threat to sea levels from melting ice when the Wilkins ice shelf in Antarctica was in danger of breaking up. Naish explained that it was the ice sheets and glaciers trapped below the ice shelf that could add new water in the case of the ice shelf melting.

In 2016, prior to a nationwide speaking tour of New Zealand, Naish and James Renwick released a document that listed what they thought were the most important reasons to be concerned about climate change.

As talks began in 2015 for the Paris Agreement, Naish stressed the importance of Antarctica in the issue of climate change because "it held 70 per cent of the worlds freshwater as ice, and if it entirely melted global sea-level would rise sea-levels by 60m". He noted that although Antarctica was protected under the Antarctic Treaty, many people were still unaware of its role in climate change. By 2019 Naish was confident that, based on scientific evidence, if greenhouse gas emissions were not in line with the Paris Agreement target of 2 degrees warming, both the East and West Antarctic ice sheets could be lost.

Naish was invited to speak at the First Antarctic Parliamentarians Assembly in London (2019). Prior to leaving, Naish noted that it was the 60th anniversary of the signing of the Antarctic Treaty and it was timely for parliamentarians and experts to be meeting if the Antarctic continent is to remain a "demilitarized zone to be preserved for scientific research...[and]...don't give up on mitigation, but at the same time, be prepared to adapt to what's coming". Naish's presentation focused on the rise in global sea levels as a result of the loss of Antarctic ice and stressed that the science indicated this was a climate emergency that parliamentarians needed to address urgently. Each speaker was asked for a final message and Naish said [it was] "right to celebrate the success of the Treaty System, but until now it has looked inwards and focused on its own interests, maybe it's now time to look more broadly at the role of Antarctica in these urgent global issues...the science makes it clear that this is, absolutely, an emergency. The people are now listening and time is critical in addressing the biggest challenge of our time: climate change and its impact on humanity". At end of the Assembly, all parliamentarians signed a statement of support for their parliaments to "adopt, where appropriate, additional national legislation contributing to the full and effective implementation of the Antarctic Treaty System".

In June 2023 Naish explained that Earth's physical and economical systems were interconnected and while "designed to reach equilibrium" through sequences of repeating change reactions known as feedback loops, the consequences may destabilize the systems, resulting in change [that] "can be abrupt and irreversible on human timescales if the threshold or tipping point is reached". In the piece, Naish used one possible sequence of changes and consequences relevant to the effect of global heating on the Antarctica's ice sheets and how this could result in rising sea levels. Based on this model, he predicted that by 2070, without a major reduction in emissions, the climate over Antarctica would "warm by 3 °C above pre-industrial temperatures" with the Southern Ocean becoming 2 °C warmer, resulting in the loss of over 45% of the sea ice. The resultant polar amplification Naish claimed, could destabilize and melt the Antarctic ice sheet such that "by 2100, 50% of ice shelves will be gone. By 2150, all will have melted". Vulnerability to marine ice sheet and ice cliff instability would be likely to cause an irreversible process of melting, with a possible rise in sea levels of three metres per century, leading Naish to conclude: "These changes highlight the urgency for immediate and deep cuts to emissions. Antarctica has to remain a stable ice-covered continent to avoid the worst impacts of rising seas".
