= Peter Barrett (geologist) =

New Zealand geologist (1940–2026)

Peter Barrett NZAM
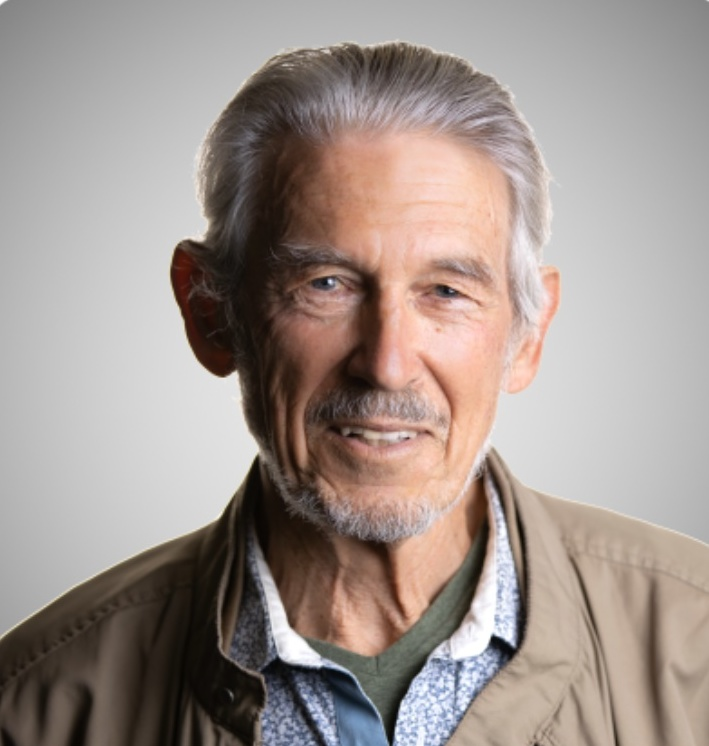
- Barrett in 2019
- Born: Peter John Barrett; 11 August 1940; Hamilton, New Zealand
- Died: 26 September 2026 (aged 86); Christchurch, New Zealand
- Education: Ohio State University
- Known for: Discovery of the first tetrapod fossils (Antarctica, 1967)
- Children: 6
- Scientific career
- Workplaces: Victoria University of Wellington
- Theses: The Te Kuiti group in the Waitomo-Te Anga area : a study of structures, sedimentation and paleogeography of calcareous sediments (1962); The post-glacial Permian and Triassic Beacon rocks in the Beardmore Glacier area, central Transantarctic Mountains, Antarctica (1968)
- Doctoral students: Rob McKay; Nancy Bertler

Peter John Barrett NZAM (11 August 1940 – 26 September 2026) was a New Zealand geologist who came to prominence after discovering the first tetrapod fossils in Antarctica in 1967.

== Background ==
Barrett was born in Hamilton on 11 August 1940, and educated at Hamilton High School. He went on to study at Auckland University College from 1958 to 1962, graduating Bachelor of Science in 1961, and Master of Science in 1963. The title of his master's thesis was The Te Kuiti group in the Waitomo-Te Anga area : a study of structures, sedimentation and paleogeography of calcareous sediments.

He married Maxine Frances Stone in 1977; the couple had six children. Barrett died unexpectedly in Christchurch on 26 September 2026, at the age of 86.

== Scientific career ==
Barrett first went to Antarctica with the University of Wisconsin in 1962, but it was during his PhD with the Institute of Polar Studies at Ohio State University in 1966 and 1968 that Barrett discovered the early Triassic period tetrapod remains. His 1968 doctoral thesis at the Institute of Polar Studies had the title The post-glacial Permian and Triassic Beacon rocks in the Beardmore Glacier area, central Transantarctic Mountains, Antarctica. After finishing his PhD, he took up a postdoctoral fellowship at Victoria University of Wellington to run an Antarctic expedition. Later research included core sampling in the Antarctic to determine historical conditions.

He was a professor, and following his retirement a professor emeritus, in the Antarctic Research Centre (ARC) at Victoria University of Wellington, and was director of the ARC from its founding in 1972 until 2007. For many years he was the New Zealand representative on the Scientific Committee on Antarctic Research (SCAR).

Barrett's doctoral students included Nancy Bertler and Rob McKay.

== Awards and honours ==
In 1978, Barrett was awarded the Polar Medal, for good services as a member of New Zealand expeditions to Antarctica in 1974–1975. He was elected a Fellow of the Royal Society of New Zealand in 1993. In 2004, he received the Marsden Medal for his lifetime contributions to science in New Zealand. In 2006, he received the SCAR President's Medal for outstanding achievement in Antarctic science. In 2008, following the death of its patron Sir Edmund Hillary, the New Zealand Antarctic Society invited Barrett to become the new patron, which he accepted. In the 2010 New Year Honours, Barrett was awarded the New Zealand Antarctic Medal for services to Antarctic science. He was made an Honorary Fellow of the Geological Society in 2011.

Barrett Glacier in the Prince Olav Mountains of Antarctica was named by the southern party of the 1963–1964 New Zealand Geological Survey Antarctic Expedition for Barrett, who was the party's geologist.
