= Antarctic Research Centre =

Research department in New Zealand

Coordinates: 41°17′23.97″S 174°46′5.56″E

- Parent institution: Victoria University of Wellington
- Established: 1972; 54 years ago
- Focus: Research in sedimentology, glaciology, paleoclimatology and Antarctic affairs.
- Director: Associate Professor Robert McKay
- Address: Cotton Building, Kelburn Parade, Kelburn
- Location: Wellington, New Zealand
- Website: https://www.wgtn.ac.nz/antarctic

The Antarctic Research Centre (ARC) is part of the School of Geography, Environment and Earth Sciences at Victoria University of Wellington. Its mission is to research "Antarctic climate history and processes, and their influence on the global climate system. The current director of the Antarctic Research Centre is Associate Professor Robert McKay.

== Directors ==
- 1972–2007: Professor Peter Barrett
- 2008–2016: Professor Tim Naish
- 2017–2019: Professor Andrew Mackintosh
- 2020–present: Professor Robert McKay

== History ==
In December 1957, geology students Barrie McKelvey and Peter Webb along with biologist Ron Balham conducted an expedition to the then unexplored McMurdo Dry Valleys via the Royal New Zealand Navy Antarctic support ship HMNZS Endeavour. This expedition formed the basic for the annual Victoria University of Wellington Antarctic Expeditions, which continue to the present day. Since this first expedition, over 400 staff and students have travelled to the continent.

The Antarctic Research Centre was established in 1972 as a part of the Department of Geology at Victoria University. The institutes first director was Professor Peter Barrett, who remained for 35 years before stepping down from the role in 2007. The centre won the New Zealand Prime Minister's Science Prize in 2020.

== Research ==
Research conducted at ARC focuses on climate change, including the analysis of ocean floor sediment cores and ice cores, and glacial modeling. Researchers from ARC have studied different factors that impact polar ice, including CO_{2} levels and oscillations in the Earth's orbit.

=== Antarctic Expeditions ===
The ARC conducts annual research explorations, known as the Victoria University of Wellington Antarctic Expeditions (VUWAE), into Antarctica. The first expedition, which explored the McMurdo Dry Valleys, was undertaken on December 30, 1957, by Peter Webb and Barrie McKelvey, two third-year geology students. Since then, students and staff have made annual expeditions to conduct research in areas such as glacial history and climate change.

Expedition leaders have named a number of features in the area, including Eureka Spurs and Ghent Ridge.

Researchers that have been involved in VUWAEs include Harold Wellman, who discovered the Alpine Fault.

Expedition reports have been digitised by the New Zealand Electronic Text Collection.
