= John T. Andrews (geologist) =

British-American geologist

John Thomas Andrews (born 1937 in Millom, Cumberland, England) is a British-American geologist and professor emeritus of geological sciences and atmospheric and oceanic sciences at the University of Colorado Boulder's Institute of Arctic and Alpine Research (INSTAAR), in Boulder, Colorado, USA.

== Early life ==
Andrews grew up in Millom, a small industrial mining town on the Cumberland coast of England, with the Irish Sea on one side and the fells of the Lake District nearby; he has credited his upbringing there during and after the Second World War with easing his later adaptation to Arctic field conditions. He attended the University of Nottingham, where he changed his academic focus from rugby to geosciences, majoring in geography with minors in geology and history.

== Education ==
Andrews was awarded his BA in geosciences in 1959 from the University of Nottingham, an MSc in geology from McGill University in Montreal, Quebec, Canada, in 1961, and a PhD from Nottingham in 1965, followed by a DSc from Nottingham in 1978.

== Academic career ==
After completing his master's thesis in 1961, Andrews was hired by the Canadian government's Department of Energy, Mines and Resources in Ottawa and began fieldwork on the glacial geology and landforms of Baffin Island, an involvement that shaped the rest of his career in Arctic and polar Quaternary research. He used this fieldwork as the basis for his PhD, completed at the University of Nottingham in 1965. In 1968, he took a faculty position in the Department of Geological Sciences at the University of Colorado Boulder, with an affiliation at INSTAAR, and there initiated a long-term Baffin Island research program that continued for decades. He retired from teaching in 2003 and was named Professor Emeritus, continuing his research as a Fellow of INSTAAR.

== Research ==
Andrews's research reshaped scientific understanding of the Pleistocene Laurentide Ice Sheet in North America. Prior to his work, prevailing views of the ice sheet's history were based largely on studies of the Great Lakes region; his detailed fieldwork in the central and eastern Canadian Arctic overturned this picture. His contributions include early reconstructions of relative sea-level change and ice-sheet thickness during the last deglaciation, which underpinned later collaborative modeling of Earth's rheology with geophysicist Richard Peltier; a 1973 analysis of the energy budget needed to deglaciate the Laurentide Ice Sheet, an early demonstration of the "100-kyr problem" in paleoclimate science; one of the first three-dimensional numerical ice-sheet models, developed in the 1970s with graduate student Molly Mahaffy; and work in the late 1980s and early 1990s on North Atlantic marine sediment records that contributed to the recognition that Heinrich events reflect partial collapses of the Laurentide Ice Sheet linked to abrupt climate change. He has authored or co-authored more than 300 peer-reviewed publications.

== Citation impact ==
As of 2026, aggregated citation-metrics profiles credit Andrews with more than 30,000 citations and a discipline h-index (D-index) of 91, placing him in the 97th percentile among ranked Earth Science researchers worldwide.

== Awards and honors ==
- Kirk Bryan Award, Quaternary Geology and Geomorphology Division, Geological Society of America (1973)
- Fellow, American Geophysical Union (2006)
- Fellow, American Association for the Advancement of Science (2011)
- Penrose Medal, Geological Society of America (2016), for his contributions to understanding how partial collapses of the Laurentide Ice Sheet are reflected in Heinrich events and abrupt climate change during the Quaternary
- Distinguished Career Award, Quaternary Geology and Geomorphology Division, Geological Society of America
- Distinguished Career Award, American Quaternary Association

In addition to these honors, Andrews received the University of Colorado's University Medal, and chaired both the Quaternary Geology and Geomorphology Division of GSA and the American Quaternary Association.

== Mentoring ==
Over the course of his career at the University of Colorado Boulder, Andrews supervised more than 75 MSc and PhD students, many of whom went on to careers in academia, government, and industry. He was an early advocate of a gender-neutral graduate program and mentored a number of women who became prominent researchers in the field. In 1970 he started an annual informal meeting for graduate students to present their research, which grew into the International Arctic Workshop, now in its sixth decade.

== Selected publications ==
- Andrews, J. T. "Variability of lake ice growth and quality in the Schefferville region, central Labrador-Ungava." Journal of Glaciology 4, 337–347 (1962).
- Andrews, J. T. & Falconer, G. "Late glacial and postglacial history and emergence of the Ottawa Islands, Hudson Bay, N.W.T." Canadian Journal of Earth Sciences 6, 1263–1276 (1969).
- Andrews, J. T. "The Wisconsin Laurentide Ice Sheet: Dispersal centers, problems of retreat, and climatic implications." Arctic and Alpine Research 5, 185–199 (1973).
- Andrews, J. T. & Mahaffy, M. A. "Growth rates of the Laurentide Ice Sheet and sea level lowering." Quaternary Research 6, 167–183 (1976).
- Andrews, J. T. "On the reconstruction of Pleistocene ice sheets: A review." Quaternary Science Reviews 1, 1–30 (1982).
- Andrews, J. T. & Tedesco, K. "Detrital carbonate-rich sediments, northwestern Labrador Sea: Implications for ice-sheet dynamics and iceberg rafting (Heinrich) events in the North Atlantic." Geology 20, 1087–1090 (1992).
- Andrews, J. T. & MacLean, B. "Hudson Strait ice streams: A review of stratigraphy, chronology, and links with North Atlantic Heinrich events." Boreas 32, 4–17 (2003).
- Andrews, J. T. & Eberl, D. D. "Determination of sediment provenance by unmixing the mineralogy of source-area sediments: The 'SedUnMix' program." Marine Geology 291, 24–33 (2012). doi:10.1016/j.margeo.2011.10.007
- Andrews, J. T. & LeMasurier, W. E. "Resolving the argument about volcanic bedrock under the West Antarctic Ice Sheet and implications for ice sheet stability and sea level change." Earth and Planetary Science Letters 568 (2021). doi:10.1016/j.epsl.2021.117035
- Andrews, J. T., Piper, D. J. W., Jennings, A. E. & Miller, G. H. "Growth of the Laurentide and Innuitian ice sheets during MIS 5 recorded in distal marine sediment." Quaternary Science Reviews 328 (2024).

A fuller list is maintained on his Google Scholar profile, linked from his INSTAAR page.
