= ANDRILL =

Scientific drilling project in Antarctica

- Site of Special Scientific Interest
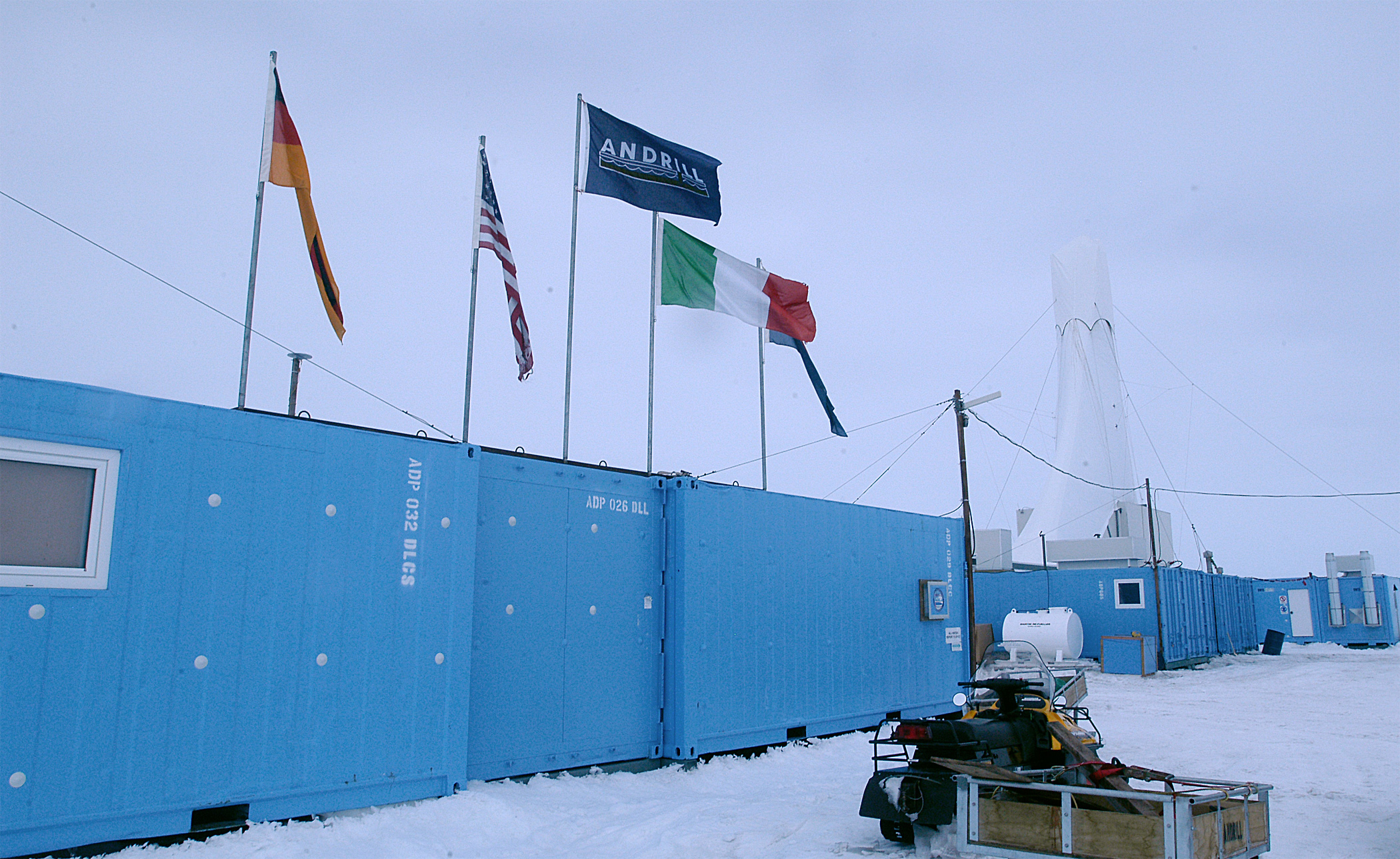
- Drill Site

- Location within Antarctica
- Location of ANDRILL.
- Area of search: Antarctica
- Coordinates: 77.888889°S 167.083333°E
- Interest: Drilling

ANDRILL (ANtarctic DRILLing Project) is a scientific drilling project in Antarctica gathering information about past periods of global warming and cooling.

The project involves scientists from Germany, Italy, New Zealand, and the United States. The project is based at McMurdo Station in Antarctica. At two sites in 2006 and 2007, ANDRILL team members drilled through ice, seawater, sediment and rock to a depth over more than 1,200 m (3,900 ft) and recovered a virtually continuous core record from the present to nearly 20 million years ago. In 2010, an ANDRILL team discovered a new species of sea anemone that lives on the underside of the Ross Ice Shelf.

== Work ==
In studying the cores, ANDRILL scientists from various disciplines are gathering detailed information about past periods of global warming and cooling. A major goal of the project is to significantly improve the understanding of Antarctica's impact on the world's oceans currents and the atmosphere by reconstructing the behavior of Antarctic sea-ice, ice-shelves, glaciers and sea currents over tens of millions of years. When sea ice forms, it pushes the salt out, creating a mass of cold, salty, dense water that sinks to the bottom of the ocean, creating deep ocean currents that affect ocean circulation and the distribution of heat worldwide. Initial results imply rapid changes and dramatically different climates at various times on the southernmost continent.

The $30 million project has achieved its operational goal of retrieving a continuous core record of the last 17 million years, filling crucial gaps left by previous drilling projects. Making use of knowledge gained through prior Antarctic drilling projects, ANDRILL employed novel techniques to reach record depths at its two drilling sites. Among the innovations deployed were a hot-water drilling system that allowed for easier ice-boring and a flexible drill pipe that could accommodate tidal oscillations and strong currents.

On December 26, 2006, ANDRILL broke the previous record of 999.1 m (3,277.9 ft) set in 2000 by the Ocean Drilling Program's drill ship, the Joides Resolution. The record-breaking core measured 1,284.87 m (4,215 ft). In 2007, drilling at the Southern McMurdo Sound, ANDRILL scientists recovered another 1,138 m (3,734 ft) of core. One goal in 2006 was to look at a period of around 3 to 5 million years ago in the Pliocene, which scientists know to be warmer. The team's sedimentologists identified more than 60 cycles in which ice sheets or glaciers advanced and retreated across McMurdo Sound.

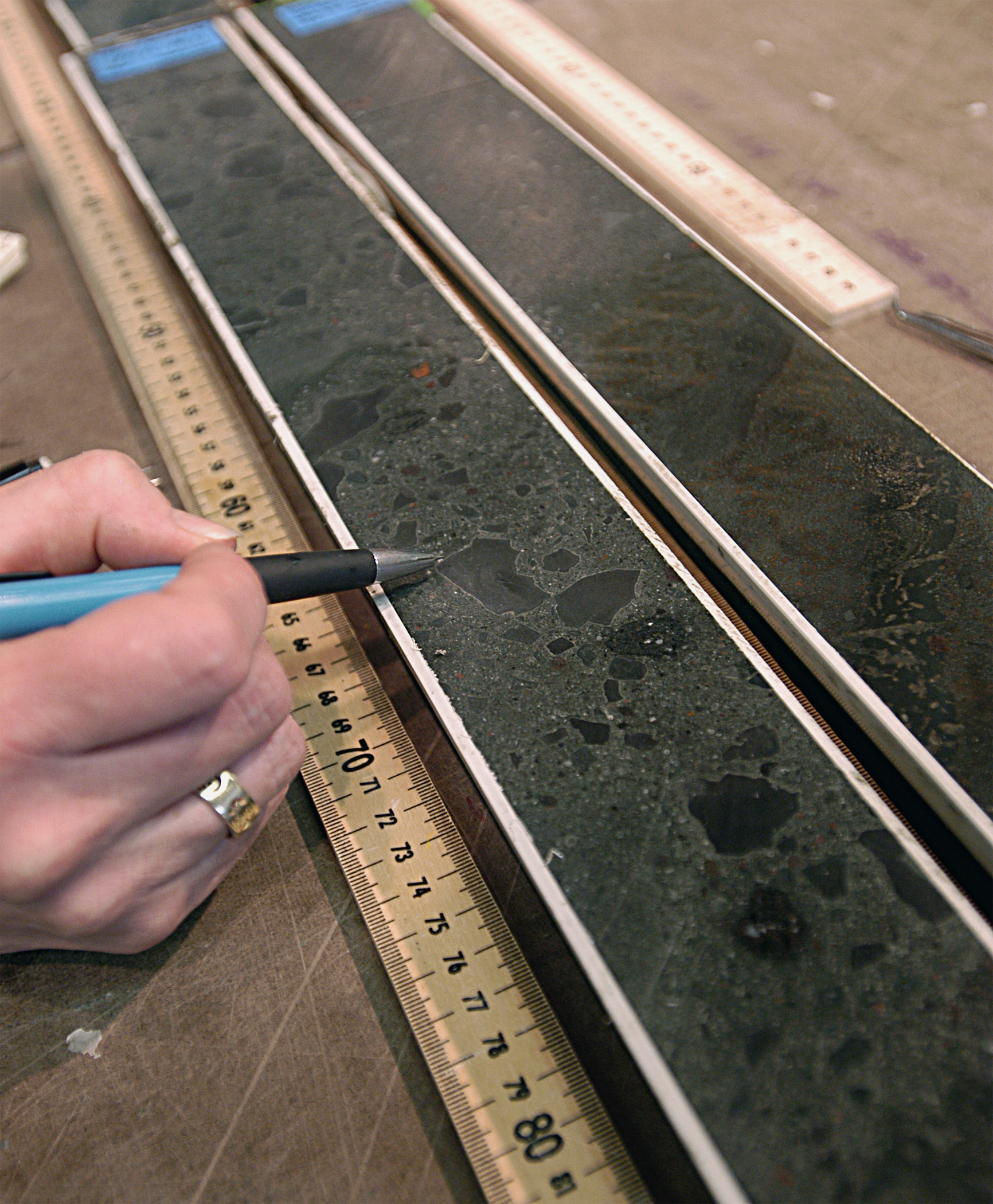
Slide of sediment core

Geologist David Harwood, who was principal investigator and co-chief scientist of the 2007 season, explained that understanding what happened in the warm period is especially important as Earth's climate continues to warm:

"If we can identify time periods in Antarctica when we had minimal ice and minimal ocean freezing, we can then look at that particular interval of time - and hopefully several examples from those intervals of time — and see how the rest of the world responded. This will provide evidence to confirm or reject a lot of interpretations that have been suggested and linked to Antarctica,"

In 2010, an ANDRILL team discovered a new species of sea anemone that lives on the underside of the Ross Ice Shelf. A sample was taken back to McMurdo station for further study, and the species was a bit mysterious as it was understood how it attaches itself to the ice. The ANDRILL team discovered it by accident, they normally work on drilling ice cores.

== Virtual Field Trip ==
The New Zealand online education programme, LEARNZ, conducted a virtual field trip to the Ross Sea drill site in November 2006. In 2007, over 3,500 New Zealand school students joined LEARNZ teacher Darren on this trip. Telephone conferences were held between students and ANDRILL scientists from the drill site and the Crary Laboratory at McMurdo station.

== Media coverage ==
NBC's news anchor Ann Curry reported from the ANDRILL camp at the U.S. McMurdo Base for a week beginning October 2, 2007. Ann Curry, reporting for a series called "Ends of the Earth," had hoped to tape at the South Pole, was held up at McMurdo due to severe weather conditions. The weather broke and about 1 a.m. local time on Friday, Nov. 9, Curry and crew finally touched down at the South Pole. It is not unusual for there to be flight delays to South Pole in the early part of the austral summer.
