= List of New Zealand scientists =

This page is a list of New Zealand scientists with articles on Wikipedia and is necessarily incomplete.

- Helen Anderson – seismonologist, public servant
- Alexander Aitken – mathematician/statistician, writer, mental calculator, musician
- Barbara Barratt – New Zealand entomologist and biocontrol expert
- Sir Brian Barratt-Boyes – heart surgeon
- Peter Barrett – geologist, Antarctic researcher
- Jacqueline Beggs (born 1962) – New Zealand entomologist and ecologist
- Patricia Bergquist – zoologist, anatomist
- Nancy Bertler – Antarctic researcher
- Rod Bieleski – plant physiologist
- Gary Bold – physicist
- Helen Bostock – paleoceanographer
- Warwick Bowen – experimental physicist
- Margaret Bradshaw – Antarctic researcher, palaeontologist
- Margaret Brimble – chemist
- Alexandra Brewis Slade – anthropologist
- Bob Brockie – artist, ecologist
- John C. Butcher – mathematician
- Walter Buller – naturalist
- Carolyn Burns – freshwater ecologist
- Sir Paul Callaghan – famous for work in magnetic resonance
- Wendy Campbell-Purdie – known for greening the Sahara Desert
- Howard Carmichael – theoretical physicist doing quantum optics
- Garth Carnaby – physicist
- Janet Carter – professor and Dean of Science at the University of Canterbury
- Amy Castle – entomologist
- Ann Chapman – limnologist
- Thomas Frederic Cheeseman – botanist, naturalist
- Charles Chilton – zoologist
- Helen Shearburn Clark (Rotman) – marine zoologist
- John G. Cleary – computer scientist
- Leonard Cockayne – botanist
- Naomi Cogger - epidemiologist
- Leslie Comrie – computer pioneer
- Lucy Cranwell – botanist
- G. H. Cunningham – "father" of New Zealand mycology
- Kathleen Curtis – mycologist, plant pathologist, first female fellow of the Royal Society of New Zealand
- Michelle Dickinson – nanotechnologist
- Joan Dingley – mycologist
- John Newton Dodd – optical physicist
- Richard Dowden – radio and space physicist
- Peter David Drummond – quantum optics specialist
- Doug Dye – plant bacteriologist
- Sir Richard Faull – neuroscientist
- Charles Fleming – ornithologist, palaeontologist
- Margot Forde – botanist
- Professor Elizabeth Franz – neuroscientist
- Derek Freeman – anthropologist
- Crispin Gardiner – physicist specialising in Quantum Optics
- Nicola Gaston – chemist
- Juliet Gerrard – biochemist and Prime Minister's chief science advisor
- Charles Gifford – teacher and promoter of astronomy
- Sir Peter David Gluckman – medical science
- Janet Grieve – biological oceanographer
- Timothy Haskell – Antarctic physicist
- Robert Cecil Hayes – seismologist
- Ron Heath - physical oceanographer
- Sir James Hector – geologist
- Heather Hendrickson – microbiologist
- Barbara Heslop – immunologist
- Helen Heslop – immunotherapist, hematologist
- Merilyn Hibma - viral immunologist
- Sue Huang - virologist
- Stephanie Hughes – neurobiologist
- Patricia Hunt – chemist
- Vicki Hyde – sceptic, psychologist
- Harold John Finlay – palaeontologist, malacologist
- Christina Hulbe – Antarctic glaciologists
- Frederick Hutton – naturalist
- Julian Jack - physiologist
- Diamond Jenness – anthropologist
- Sir Vaughan Jones – mathematician, awarded Fields Medal
- Sir Neville Jordan – engineer, businessman, philanthropist
- Mike Joy – freshwater ecologist, science communicator
- Roy Kerr – proved a solution to Einstein's equations which modelled a spinning black hole
- Pat Langhorne – Antarctic physicist
- Libby Liggins – Marine ecologist
- Alan G MacDiarmid – co-winner of the 2000 Nobel Prize in Chemistry
- Bruce Marshall – taxonomist, malacologist
- Sir Harold Marshall – acoustician
- John Marwick – palaeontologist, geologist
- Ruth Mason – botanist
- Sir Archie McIndoe – pioneer plastic surgeon
- Tracey McIntosh – sociologist
- Don Merton – conservationist
- Brian Molloy – botanist
- Pérrine Moncrieff – ornithologist
- Mary Morgan-Richards – evolutionary biologist
- Tim Naish – glaciologist
- John Morton – biologist, theologian
- Wendy Nelson – marine algae expert
- Frank Newhook – plant pathologist
- Dame Charmian O'Connor – organic chemist
- Stephen Parke – theoretical physicist
- David Penny – biologist
- William Pickering – central figure and pioneer of NASA space exploration
- Winston Ponder – malacologist
- Arthur William Baden Powell – naturalist, malacologist, palaeontologist
- Margaret Reid – physicist specialising in quantum optics
- James Renwick – climate scientist
- Christina Riesselman – paleoceanographer
- Natalie Robinson – polar oceanographer
- Jacqueline Rowarth – agricultural scientist
- Ernest Rutherford, 1st Baron Rutherford of Nelson – scientist and winner of the 1908 Nobel Prize in Chemistry
- Jim Salinger – climate scientist
- Luitgard Schwendenmann, ecosystem scientist
- Liz Slooten – zoologist
- Ruth Spearing – haematologist
- David Spence – mathematician
- Gerald Stokell – horticulturist, ichthyologist
- Kathryn Stowell – biochemist
- Vida Stout – limnologist
- Mary Sutherland – botanist
- Jeff Tallon – physicist
- Warren Tate – biochemist
- Reremoana Theodore – epidemiologist
- Beatrice Tinsley – astronomer and cosmologist
- Kevin Trenberth – meteorologist and atmospheric scientist
- Ingrid N. Visser – marine biologist known for studying orcas
- Sir Julius von Haast – geologist
- Dan Walls – physicist and pioneer in quantum optics
- Kath Walker, conservation scientist
- Ian Warrington – horticulturalist, administrator
- Robert Webster – discovered the link between human flu and bird flu
- William Henry Webster – malacologist and conchcologist
- Joan Wiffen – paleontologist, discovered first dinosaur fossils in New Zealand
- Siouxsie Wiles – microbiologist
- Maurice Wilkins – shared the 1962 Nobel Prize in Medicine for his part in elucidating the structure of DNA
- Allan Charles Wilson – biochemist; revolutionary evolutionist
- Christine Winterbourn – pathologist
- Trecia Wouldes - professor of psychological medicine
- David Wratt – ex-Chief Climate Scientist, National Institute of Water and Atmospheric Research (NIWA)
- Gillian Wratt – Antarctic researcher, first woman director of the New Zealand Antarctic Programme
- John Stuart Yeates – botanist

== Other lists of New Zealand scientists ==
- Hector Memorial Medal recipients
- Rutherford Medal recipients
- New Zealand Antarctic Medal recipients
- Sciblogs.co.nz
- List of New Zealand women botanists
