= Fiona Cram =

New Zealand social psychologist

Fiona Cram MNZM
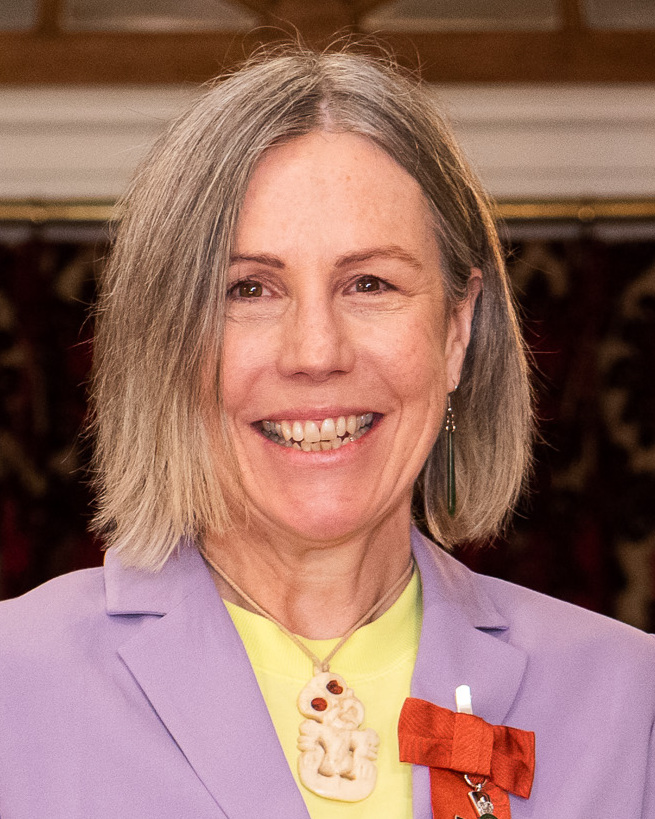
- Cram in 2019

Academic background
- Education: University of Otago

Academic work
- Discipline: Social psychology
- Institutions: University of Auckland
- Doctoral students: Leonie Pihama
- Notable students: Sue Crengle

Fiona May Cram MNZM is a New Zealand social psychologist and researcher, of Ngāti Pāhauwera descent. In the 2019 Queen's Birthday Honours, Cram was appointed a Member of the Order of New Zealand, for services to Māori health and education.

== Early life and education ==
Cram was born in Gisborne, and attended Mangapapa Primary School, Ilminster Intermediate and Lytton High School. She is of Māori descent, and affiliates to Ngāti Pāhauwera. Cram completed a Bachelor of Arts, a Post-Graduate Diploma in Psychology and a PhD at the University of Otago in social and developmental psychology.

== Research career ==
Cram joined the faculty of the University of Auckland in 1990 as a lecturer in the Department of Psychology, and from 1998 until 2003 she was director of the university's International Research Institute for Māori and Indigenous Education. Cram also held a position as a visiting research fellow at the Otago School of Medicine in Wellington, at the Eru Pomare Māori Health Research Centre. In 2003 Cram set up Katoa Limited, which conducts Kaupapa Māori research, evaluation and training. Her research interests include Māori justice, education and health, Māori and science, and Māori language. Cram's notable students include Leonie Pihama and Sue Crengle.

Cram has been on the board of the Health Research Council, as well as sitting on a number of committees, including the Māori Health Research Committee and the Public Health Research Committee. She has served as the editor in chief of the journal Evaluation Matters - He Take To Te Aromatawai, published by the New Zealand Association for Educational Research. As of 2023 she is the chair of Te Tāhū Hauora (the Health Quality and Safety Commission)'s Family Violence Death Review Committee. In 2023 the committee released their eighth report, which recommended a new system be set up to better support child survivors of family violence resulting in death.

== Honours and awards ==
In the 2019 Queen's Birthday Honours, Cram was appointed a Member of the Order of New Zealand, for services to Māori health and education. She has been named as one of 100 Māori leaders recognised 'for their contributions, service, vision, dedication and expertise towards constructive change and improvement to Māori health'.

== Selected works ==
- Robson, Bridget; Purdie, Gordon; Cram, Fiona; Shirley Simmonds (2007). "Age standardisation - an indigenous standard?". Emerging Themes in Epidemiology. 4: 3. doi:10.1186/1742-7622-4-3. PMC 1876455. PMID 17498317. Wikidata Q35808523.
- Charrissa Makowharemahihi; Beverley A. Lawton; Cram, Fiona; Ngata, Tina; Selina Brown; Robson, Bridget (2014). "Initiation of maternity care for young Maori women under 20 years of age". The New Zealand Medical Journal. 127 (1393): 52–61. PMID 24816956. Wikidata Q45919703.
- Adcock, Anna; Cram, Fiona; Lawton, Beverley Anne; Stacie E Geller; Hibma, Merilyn; Sykes, Peter H.; MacDonald, Evelyn; Wendy Dallas-Katoa; Bronwyn Rendle; Tracey Cornell; Tania Mataki; Tania Rangiwhetu; Naieta Gifkins; Selah Hart (2019). "Acceptability of self-taken vaginal HPV sample for cervical screening among an under-screened Indigenous population". Australian and New Zealand Journal of Obstetrics and Gynaecology. 59 (2): 301–307. doi:10.1111/ajo.12933. PMID 30614524. Wikidata Q90916584.
- MacDonald, Evelyn; Stacie E Geller; Nokuthaba Sibanda; Kendall Stevenson; Lorna Denmead; Adcock, Anna; Cram, Fiona; Hibma, Merilyn; Sykes, Peter H.; Lawton, Beverley Anne (2020). "Reaching under-screened/never-screened indigenous peoples with human papilloma virus self-testing: A community-based cluster randomised controlled trial". Australian and New Zealand Journal of Obstetrics and Gynaecology. doi:10.1111/ajo.13285. PMID 33350455. Wikidata Q104555841.
- Jacqueline Short; Cram, Fiona; Michael Roguski; Rachel Smith; Koziol, Jane (2019). "Thinking differently: Re-framing family violence responsiveness in the mental health and addictions health care context". International Journal of Mental Health Nursing. 28 (5): 1206–1216. doi:10.1111/inm.12641. PMID 31441998. Wikidata Q92813985.
- Liza K. Edmonds; Cram, Fiona; Matthew Bennett; et al. (2022). "Hapū Ora (pregnancy wellness): Māori research responses from conception, through pregnancy and 'the first 1000 days' – a call to action for us all". Journal of the Royal Society of New Zealand. 52 (4): 318–334. doi:10.1080/03036758.2022.2075401. PMID 39440319. Wikidata Q117579389.
- Lawton, Beverley Anne; Francesca Storey; Nokuthaba Sibanda; Matthew Bennett; Charles Lambert; Stacie Geller; Liza Edmonds; Cram, Fiona (2021). "He Korowai Manaaki (Pregnancy Wraparound Care): Protocol for a Cluster Randomized Clinical Trial". JMIR Research Protocols. 10 (1) e18154. doi:10.2196/18154. PMC 7880808. PMID 33512321. Wikidata Q117579391.
