= Tina Ngata =

Environmental and Indigenous rights advocate from New Zealand

Tina Ngata is an advocate, author and researcher based in New Zealand.

== Early years and education ==
Ngata is Māori and affiliates with the Ngāti Porou nation. When she was young she lived in Māngere, Auckland, where her father was a police officer. Later the family lived on the Gold Coast, Australia.

From 2016 to 2018 Ngata undertook master's studies at Te Whare Wananga o Awanuiarangi, graduating in 2019. Her masters thesis was on the application of the Doctrine of Discovery in New Zealand. Her undergraduate degree was a Bachelor of Arts majoring in Māori Studies from Massey University.

== Career ==
Ngata advocates for environmental issues, Indigenous peoples and human rights. Ngata promotes conservation from an Indigenous lens as 'best practice for a globally sustainable future'.

Ngata has written articles for media outlets including E-Tangata (an on-line magazine that promotes stories from a Māori and Pasifika perspective), The Spinoff and Pantograph Punch. She has contributed opinion pieces for newspapers The New Zealand Herald and the Guardian. She writes on a wide range of topics; for example, Ngata has articulated concern to parts of free trade negotiations and agreements between countries including United States-Mexico-Canada Agreement (USMCA) and Trans Pacific Partnership Agreement (TPPA). Another article draws connections to the Voice referendum in Australia and the 2023 New Zealand election campaign, and another on the negative outcomes from the stereotype of Māori people as a 'warrior race'.

Racism is an economic project. The idea that one group has a right to claim domination over another — based on supremacy of genes, skin colour, ethnicity or similar characteristics — was never a mere intellectual exercise. From the very beginning, it’s been about the extraction of labour, resources and land from non-white people.

— Tina Ngata, E-Tangata, Jul 30, 2023

In 2023 Ngata was the Activist in Residence with the Center for Culture-Centered Approach to Research & Evaluation (CARE) on anti-racism and in connection with Professor Mohan Dutta at Massey University (Manawatū campus).

Anti-racist work Ngata has been involved in includes a public deputation to the Gisborne District Council in 2020 around the issue of statues related to Captain James Cook. Ngata articulates the concept of 'ethical remembering' with regards to public monuments as not erasing history, but examining it in a different light.

As a researcher Ngata has experience in Kaupapa Māori and quantitative Māori-centered research. Some of the work she has done has contributed to policy and planning documents for hapū and iwi, and she has developed programmes for freshwater and native forest monitoring. On the East Cape in 2018 Ngata was involved in environmental monitoring to protect the Waiapu River including leading a series of workshops.

Ngata speaks at many events and conferences, including in 2018 at the National Aquarium of New Zealand, Napier; this talk was with Marcus Eriksen and Anna Cummins and was about plastic pollution in the Pacific Ocean. Another in 2020 was a webinar called Environmental Racism and Te Tiriti o Waitangi, chaired by Catherine Delahunty and on a panel with Moea Armstrong and Tuhi Ao Bailey, part of a year long event Te Tiriti-based Futures + Anti-Racism 2020. In 2021 Ngata was on a panel at a conference for leaders in mental health, addiction and disability called Celebrating Leadership – Courageous and Bold.

Ngata has contributed to the place Matakaoa in the Gisborne region to strengthen health and safety outcomes for the community through their COVID-19 response. These efforts won an award in 2022, Ngā Pou Whirinaki o te Tau – NZ Community of the Year award for 'excellence, innovation and aroha shown by whānau of Matakaoa in facing the dangers of COVID-19'. Immediately after Cyclone Gabrielle, Ngata and others rallied with a successful fundraising campaign for disaster response and preparedness for the impacted communities of Matakaoa, Tokomaru, Te Puia and Waipiro Bay.

In 2022 Ngata collaborated with Terri Crawford to create a digital artwork called I am Hine that was part of Mana Moana Volume 2: Digital Ocean, an immersive web-based digital art experience.

== Selected publications ==
- Lawton, Beverley Anne; Cram, Fiona; Charrissa Makowharemahihi; Ngata, Tina; Robson, Bridget; Selina Brown; Warahi Campbell (2013). "Developing a Kaupapa Māori Research Project to Help Reduce Health Disparities Experienced by Young Māori Women and Their Babies". AlterNative. 9 (3): 246–261. doi:10.1177/117718011300900305. Wikidata Q61846665.
- Charrissa Makowharemahihi; Beverley A. Lawton; Cram, Fiona; Ngata, Tina; Selina Brown; Robson, Bridget (2014). "Initiation of maternity care for young Maori women under 20 years of age". The New Zealand Medical Journal. 127 (1393): 52–61. PMID 24816956. Wikidata Q45919703.
- Lawton, Beverley Anne; Charrissa Makowharemahihi; Cram, Fiona; Robson, Bridget; Ngata, Tina (2016). "Pounamu: E Hine: access to contraception for indigenous Mãori teenage mothers". Journal of Primary Health Care. 8 (1): 52–59. doi:10.1071/hc15021. PMID 27477375. Wikidata Q61846656.
- Wai māori, (chapter) Mountains to Sea, Solving New Zealand’s Freshwater Crisis, (Nov 2018), Mike Joy (editor) Bridget Williams Books (BWB) publisher
- Kia Mau: Resisting Colonial Fictions (2019) Rebel Press, Trades Hall, Wellington, ISBN 978-0-473-49495-7
- Sascha Fuller; Ngata, Tina; Stephanie B. Borrelle; Farrelly, Trisia Angela (2022). "Plastics pollution as waste colonialism in Te Moananui". Journal of Political Ecology. 29 (1). doi:10.2458/jpe.2401. Wikidata Q124287729.
