= Roy Harrison =

Roy Harrison may refer to:

- Roy Harrison (cricketer) (born 1939), Irish cricketer
- Roy Harrison (entomologist) (1918–2006), New Zealand entomologist
- Roy M. Harrison (born 1948), British environmental scientist
