= Inky (octopus) =

Individual octopus

Inky was a common New Zealand octopus who lived at the National Aquarium of New Zealand, in the city of Napier, from 2014 until his escape in 2016. He was found offshore in 2014 in a crayfish pot and was then brought to the aquarium. In 2016 he escaped the aquarium by leaving his tank, crawling across the floor and down into a drain pipe which went out to sea. The escape received worldwide media attention, and he was never found.

== Life and escape ==
Inky, a male common New Zealand octopus, was taken to the National Aquarium of New Zealand in 2014 after a fisherman found him in a crayfish pot half a kilometre north of Napier Port, near Pania reef. At the time he had a few scars and injuries to his limbs. A few months later a naming competition was held by the Napier City Council, and the winning name was Inky, which is a reference to the ink that octopodes can squirt. At the aquarium he had games and toys to play with.

Inky escaped from the aquarium in early 2016. It is believed that Inky escaped from his tank in the middle of the night, went across the floor, leaving octopus tracks, and then down a 50-metre-long drain pipe which went out to sea and had a diameter of about 150 millimetres. Workers left the tank slightly open after doing maintenance work on the same day that he had escaped. Another theory was that he went into an overflow pipe at the top of the tank, which also led to the drain. The aquarium checked the pipes but did not find him, and did not believe that he had been stolen. The tank had another octopus in it, named Blotchy, but he did not escape from the tank. The aquarium did not plan on finding a replacement octopus.

Inky was never found. In January 2017 Otago University teuthologist Jean McKinnon suggested that Inky was dead by that point because adult octopodes live for two years. There is also the possibility that Inky travelled to one of the reefs on the coastline of the Hawke's Bay and mated there. Octopodes die a few months after mating. As of 2017, a moray eel named Psycho lives in Inky's old tank.

== Media coverage ==
It took three months for the news about the escape to go public. It attracted worldwide media attention, including from BBC News, The New York Times, CNN and The Daily Telegraph. This media attention reportedly "rivalled" the attention gathered by the penguin Happy Feet who arrived in New Zealand in 2011. The website Stuff has reported that Inky had surpassed the famous New Zealand sheep Shrek—who was found after not being shorn for several years—by "several degrees of celebrity". Inky was not the first famous New Zealand octopus; one in Wellington named Ozymandias gathered media attention in 2014 after setting a world record for opening jars.

In 2017 the author Casey Lyall wrote a children's book about Inky, named Inky's Great Escape, and in 2018 Penguin Books published the children's book Inky the Octopus. The aquarium has also received stories about the octopus from dyslexic children in the United States.
