= Entomological Society of New Zealand =

Scientific society in New Zealand

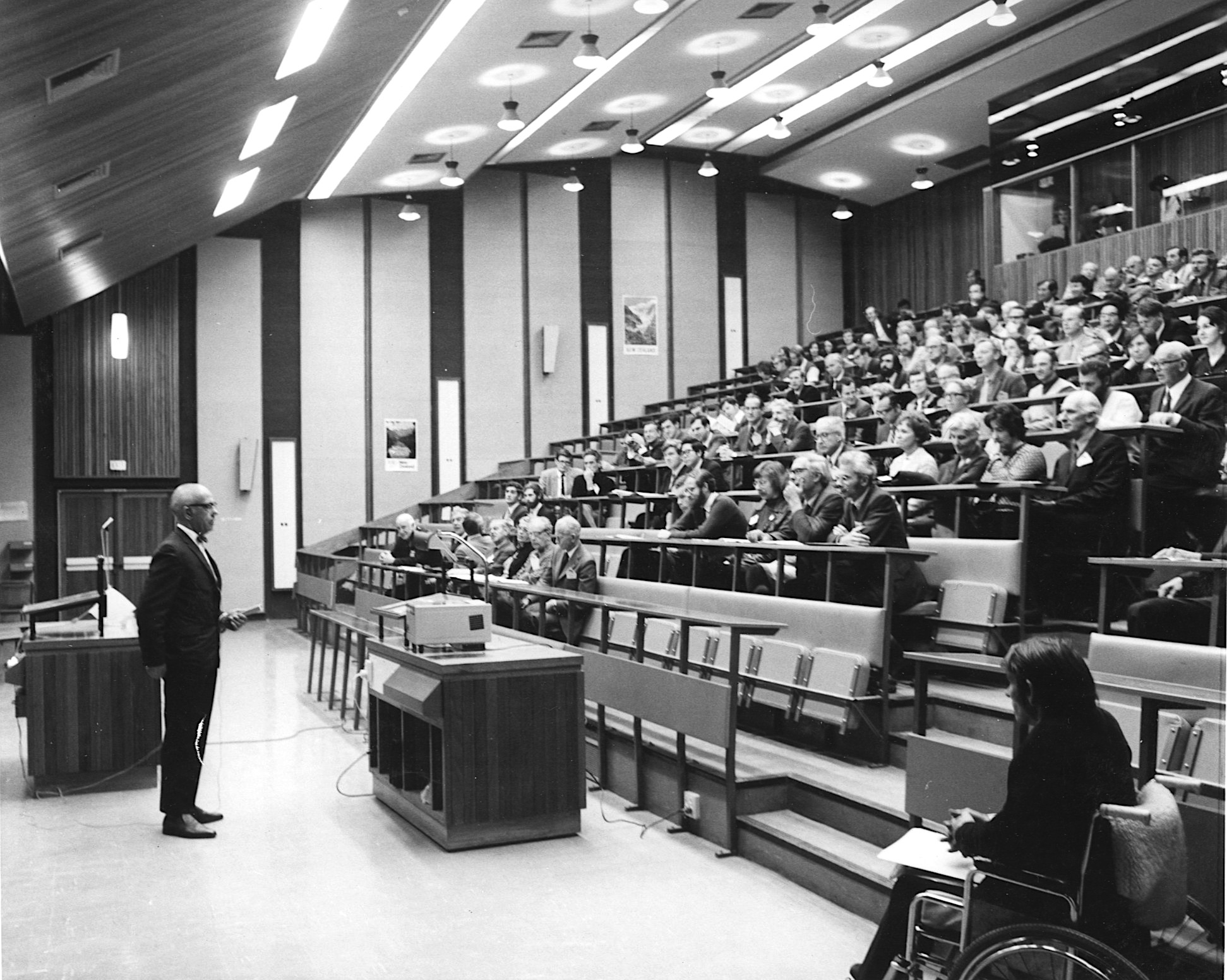
- Photo of the 21st meeting of the Entomological Society of New Zealand at Lincoln University (1972)
- Abbreviation: ESNZ
- Formation: 1951; 75 years ago
- Registration no.: CC39806
- Purpose: Stimulating the study and appreciation of entomology
- Region served: New Zealand
- Members: Nearly 250 (2025)
- Publication: New Zealand Entomologist, The Wētā
- Website: ento.org.nz

The Entomological Society of New Zealand promotes interest in and the study of insects (entomology) and related arthropods for both professional entomologists and amateurs. It was founded in 1951.

== Founding ==
The society was founded in 1951 in Christchurch during the Royal Society of New Zealand's Seventh New Zealand Science Congress. There were initially 50 registered members. Notable original members included:

- David Miller
- Lionel Dumbleton
- Alan Lowe
- William Cottier
- Ray Forster
- Edwin Gourlay
- Roy Harrison
- Kenneth Lamb
- Graeme Ramsay
- Geoffrey Satchell
- Graham Turbott
- Keith Wise

== Present day ==
The society reported having nearly 250 members as of April 2025. Since 2023, the society has hosted an annual "New Zealand Bug of the Year" competition where the public votes for a New Zealand native invertebrate from a pool of candidates as the "Bug of the Year".

== Publications ==
The society publishes two serials. The main one is New Zealand Entomologist, a peer-reviewed journal for scientists that has been published since 1951. The Wētā is a news bulletin that has been published since 1977. It reports news, opinions and findings of interest that are not suitable for formal peer-reviewed publication.

== Fellows ==
As of April 2025, there have been 15 society fellows:

- Guillermo Kuschel (1988)
- Roy Harrison (1990)
- Ray Forster (1994)
- Brenda May (1998)
- John Dugdale (2001)
- Ian Mclellan (2004)
- Beverley Holloway (2009)
- George Gibbs (2010)
- Barbara Barratt (2011)
- Rowan Emberson (2014)
- Alan Eyles (2014)
- Ricardo Palma (2015)
- Peter Johns (2017)
- Jacqueline Beggs (2023)
- Richard Leschen (2023)
