= Ann Brower =

New Zealand environmental geography academic

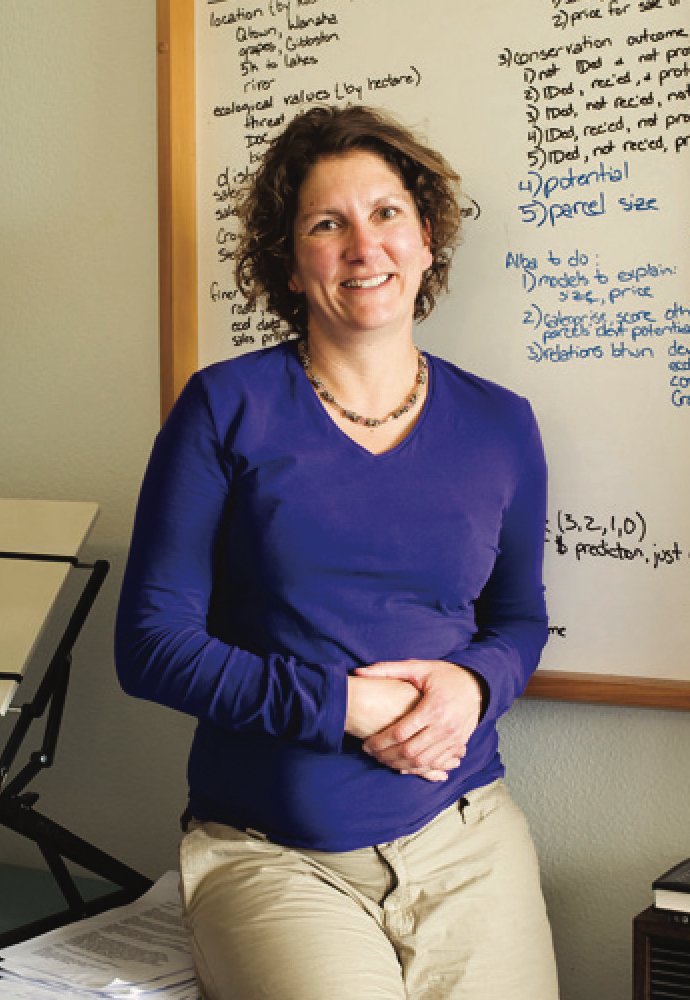
Ann Brower in 2010

Ann Brower is an environmental geographer from New Zealand. A survivor of the 2011 Christchurch earthquake, she successfully lobbied for a law change to the Building Act, which was passed in 2016 as the Brower Amendment. Brower was promoted to full professor at the University of Canterbury in December 2021. In 2022 she won the Charles Fleming Award for Environmental Achievement.

== Career ==
Brower holds a Bachelor of Arts degree from Pomona College, California, a Masters in Forest Science from Yale University, a Masters in Political Science from the University of California, Berkeley and a PhD in Environmental Science, Policy, and Management from the University of California, Berkeley. Her specialist area is environmental policy, particularly in relation to state-owned lands and natural resources in the US, Australia, and New Zealand. She was formerly an associate professor in the Department of Environmental Management at Lincoln University, Canterbury, New Zealand and as of 2018 she was a senior lecturer in geography at the University of Canterbury. In December 2021, Brower was promoted to full professor in the School of Earth and Environment at the University of Canterbury.

On 22 February 2011, Brower was on a bus travelling along Colombo Street in the central city area of Christchurch when an earthquake struck. The parapet of unreinforced masonry on the building at 603 and 605 Colombo Street collapsed onto the street, crushing the bus and killing eight passengers and four passers-by. Brower survived and was rescued by members of the public and taken to hospital.

Later in 2011, Brower testified at the Royal Commission of Inquiry into building performance in the Canterbury earthquakes. She also made a submission and spoke to the Parliamentary Select Committee considering the commission's recommendations twice. She also wrote a number of opinion pieces which explained her policy recommendations and were published in the mainstream media.

In September 2015, Nick Smith, the Minister for Building and Housing, invited Brower to join him when he announced changes to the Building Act which were a result of Brower's advocacy: unreinforced buildings with façades and verandas that are in public spaces frequented by pedestrians and vehicles would be required to be assessed and repaired in half the normal time. Smith called Brower a "true New Zealand hero"; Mayor of Christchurch Lianne Dalziel also recognised Brower's bravery and persistence in pressing for change.

== Awards ==
In 2018, it was announced that Brower had won the 2017 Critic & Conscience of Society Award from the Gama Foundation. In 2022 Brower was awarded the Charles Fleming Award for Environmental Achievement by the Royal Society Te Apārangi "for her pioneering interdisciplinary research that challenged the foundations of high country tenure review, and catalysed legislative reform to improve the conservation of New Zealand's unique landscapes and biodiversity".

== Publications ==
Brower has published the following:

- Who owns the high country?, 2008, Craig Potton Publishing
- Parapets, politics, and making a difference: Lessons from Christchurch, 2017, Earthquake Spectra
