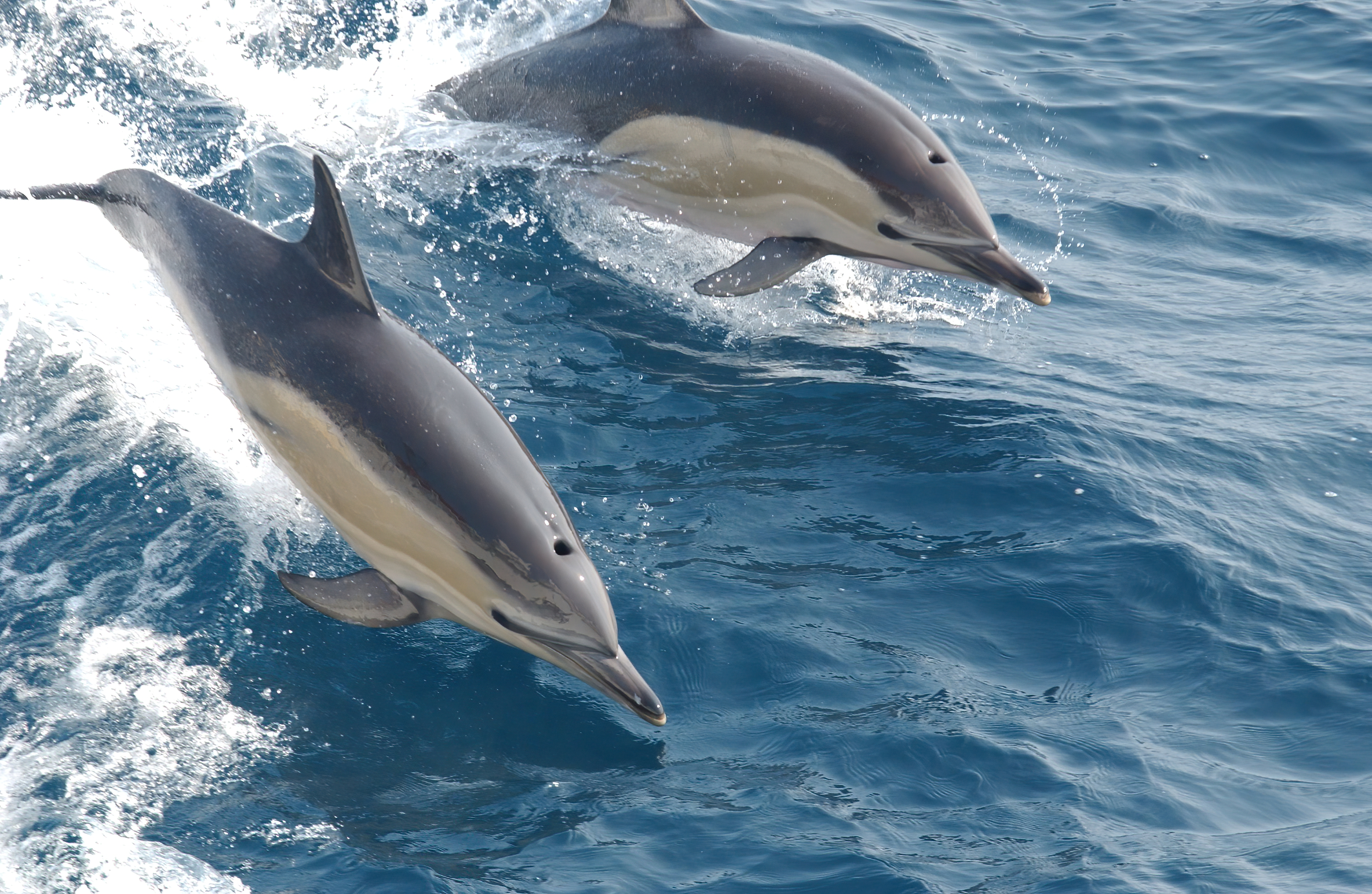
- Common dolphins doing a behavior known as "porpoising"
- Size compared to an average human

Conservation status
- Least Concern (IUCN 3.1)

- Secure (NatureServe)
- CITES Appendix II

Scientific classification
- Kingdom: Animalia
- Phylum: Chordata
- Class: Mammalia
- Order: Artiodactyla
- Infraorder: Cetacea
- Family: Delphinidae
- Genus: Delphinus; Linnaeus, 1758
- Species: D. delphis

Binomial name
- Delphinus delphis Linnaeus, 1758

Subspecies
- D. d. delphis; D. d. bairdii; D. d. ponticus; D. d. tropicalis
- Range of common dolphin

Synonyms
- List: Delphinus albimanus Peale, 1848; Delphinus algeriensis Loche, 1860; Delphinus capensis Gray, 1828; Delphinus delphus Linnaeus, 1758; Delphinus forsteri Gray, 1846; Delphinus fulvifasciatus Wagner, 1846; Delphinus fulvofasciatus True, 1889; Delphinus janira Gray, 1846; Delphinus loriger Wiegmann, 1846; Delphinus marginatus Lafont, 1868; Delphinus novaezealandiae Gray, 1850; Delphinus novaezeelandiae Wagner, 1846; Delphinus novaezelandiae Quoy & Gaimard, 1830; Delphinus vulgaris Lacépède, 1804; Delphinus zelandae Gray, 1853

= Common dolphin =

Species of mammal

The common dolphin (Delphinus delphis) is the most abundant cetacean in the world, with an estimated global population of about six million. It is currently the only member of the genus Delphinus, the type genus of the subfamily Delphininae. This places it as a close relative of the bottlenose dolphin, humpback dolphin, striped dolphin, spinner dolphin, Clymene dolphin, spotted dolphin, Fraser's dolphin, the tucuxi, and the Guiana dolphin.

The common dolphin was once divided into two different species, the short-beaked common dolphin and the long-beaked common dolphin. These are now generally regarded as ecotypes. Recent research shows that many long-beaked populations worldwide are not closely related to one another, often originating from short-beaked ancestors, and they do not consistently share the same derived traits. For this reason, these forms are no longer classified as separate species.

Despite its name, the common dolphin is not widely considered the "archetypal" dolphin; that role is more often associated with the bottlenose dolphin, largely because of its frequent appearances in aquaria and the media. Nevertheless, the common dolphin held cultural significance in antiquity and frequently appeared in Greek and Roman art, such as in murals created by the Minoan civilization.

== Physical characteristics ==
Common dolphin are medium-sized dolphins; adults range between 1.9 and 2.5 m (6.2 and 8.2 ft) long, and can weigh between 80–235 kg (176–518 lb), although the range between 80–150 kg (180–330 lb) is more common. Males are generally longer and heavier. The dolphin's coloration is unusual, with a dark back and white belly (countershading), while on each side is an hourglass pattern colored light grey, yellow, or gold in front and dirty grey in back. They have long, thin rostra with up to 50–60 small, sharp, interlocking teeth on each side of each jaw.

== Taxonomy ==
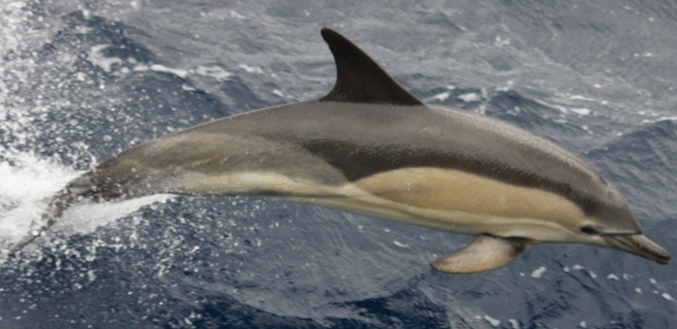
"Short-beaked" common dolphin, Ireland

Despite the historic practice of lumping the entire genus Delphinus into a single species, these widely distributed dolphins exhibit a wide variety of sizes, shapes and colors. Indeed, over the past few decades, over 20 distinct species in the genus have been proposed. Scientists in California in the 1960s concluded there were two species — the long-beaked and short-beaked. The long-beaked common dolphin was thought to have a disjointed range in coastal areas in tropical and warmer temperate oceans; this range included parts of western and southern Africa, much of western South America, central California to central Mexico, coastal Peru, the seas around Japan, Korea and Taiwan, and possibly near Oman. Vagrants have been recorded as far north as Vancouver Island.

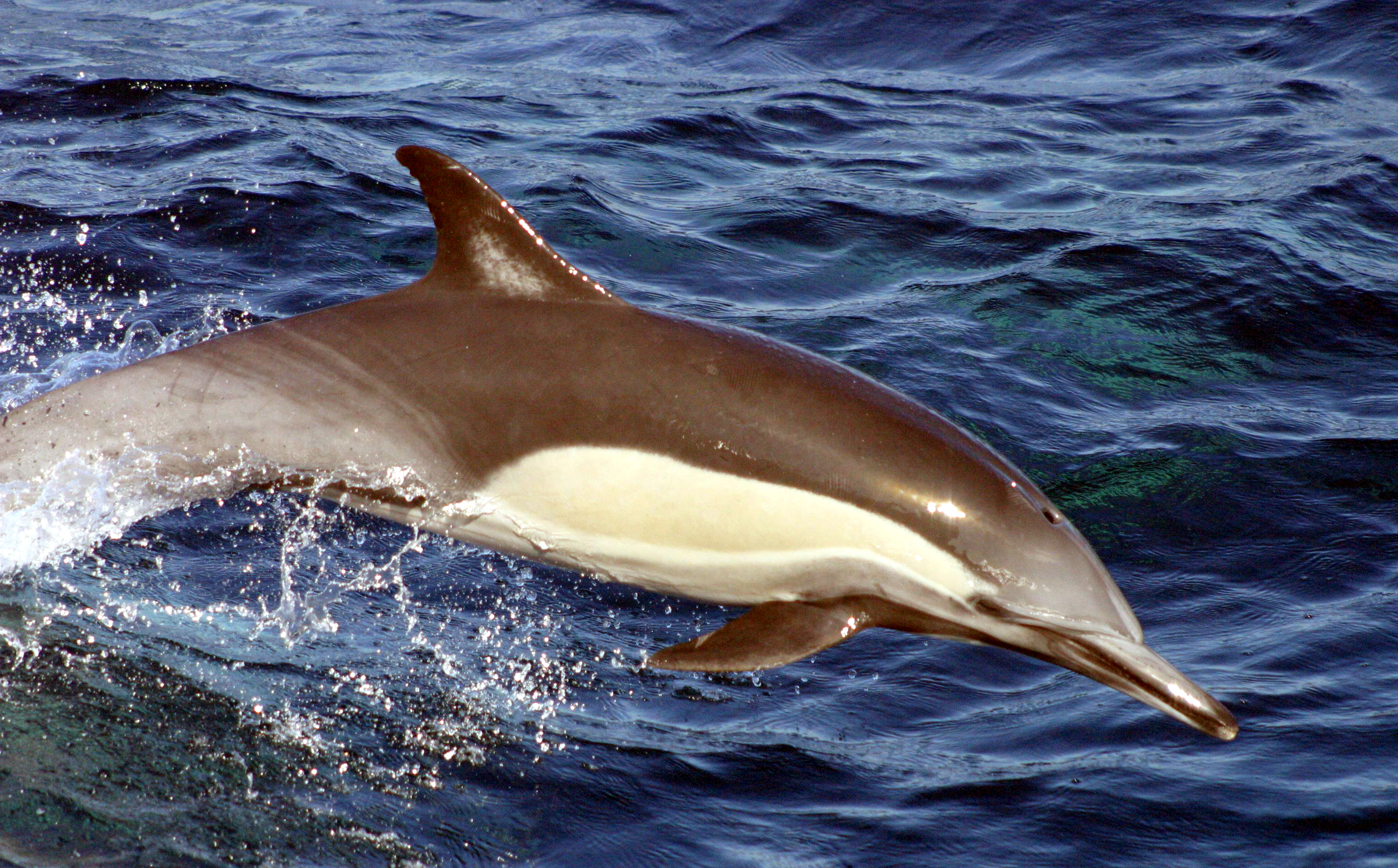
"Long-beaked" common dolphin, California

This analysis was seemingly confirmed by a more in-depth genetic study in the 1990s. This study also suggested a third species (D. tropicalis, common name Arabian common dolphin or Indo-Pacific common dolphin), characterized by an even longer and thinner beak and found in the Red Sea and Indian Ocean, might be distinguished from the long-beaked species.

Recent evidence has demonstrated that different populations of long-beaked common dolphins around the world are not closely related to one another and are often descendant from a short-beaked ancestor (as well as not sharing common derived characters). Therefore, all long-beaked and short-beaked common dolphin populations are currently listed as the same species; they are all subspecies of Delphinus delphis. Currently, the common dolphin is divided into four subspecies:

- D. d. delphis, the nominate subspecies
- D. d. bairdii, the Eastern North Pacific long-beaked common dolphin (sometimes elevated to full species)
- D. d. ponticus, the Black Sea common dolphin
- D. d. tropicalis, the Arabian or Indo-Pacific common dolphin

=== Fossil record ===
Many extinct cetacean species were once lumped into Delphinus, but have since been moved to other genera. In the late 19th century several fossil species were described as part of this genus, such as Delphinus baltringii, Delphinus delannoy and Delphinus domeykoi. However, these species are no longer considered valid. Another species known as Delphinus brevidens was reassigned to the genus Stereodelphis, now generally considered synonymous with Squalodon.

== Biology ==
Black Sea common dolphin, near Crimea

Common dolphins live in both warm-temperate and tropical waters ranging from 40–60°N to 50°S. Long-beaked common dolphins mostly inhabit shallow, warm coastal water. Short-beaked common dolphins are common "along shelf edges and in areas with sharp bottom relief such as seamounts and escarpments". In general, they are a widely distributed species. They can be found around the world in both offshore and coastal waters. In the Northwest Atlantic, they can be found from Cape Hatteras to Newfoundland and are strongly associated with the Gulf Stream. Dolphins in this region can often be found in areas that have certain geological factors like underwater canyons and ridges because this is where up-welling occurs, resulting in a greater abundance of nutrients. In the Eastern Pacific, common dolphins are found along the coast of California and are associated with the California current. Short-beaked common dolphins can also be found in Europe, particularly the Scotian Shelf, the Black Sea and the Mediterranean. In the Southern Hemisphere, they are abundant in the southwestern Pacific, around New Zealand and southern Australia. They are generally a pelagic species that are often found in waters 650–6,500 ft (200–1,980 metres) deep, with the short-beaked type preferring deeper waters than the long-beaked type Temperature also plays a large role in the congregation of dolphins. For example, in the western North Atlantic, almost all sightings of common dolphins took place in waters from 16 to 20 °C (61 to 68 °F). However, common dolphins were sighted in waters as cold as 5 °C (41 °F).

=== Sociality ===
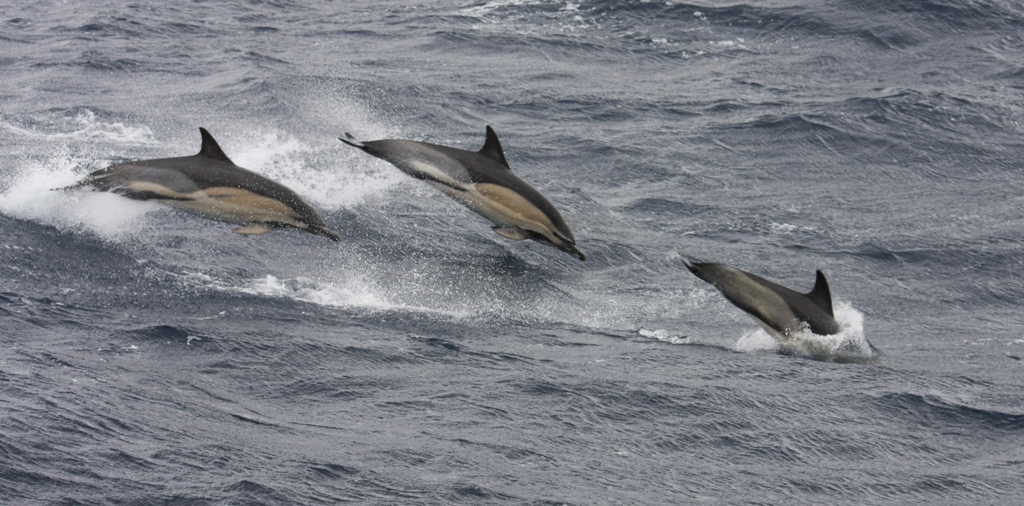
Common dolphins porpoising, Ireland

Common dolphins can live in aggregations or "pods" of hundreds or even thousands of dolphins. Common dolphins are often seen in groups numbering several hundred individuals (with subgroups consisting of 20–30 individuals). Occasionally, different groups will come together to form mega-pods which can consist of over 10,000 dolphins. Genetic studies in the Northeast Atlantic suggest that common dolphin pods generally do not consist of close kin, but rather of members that are not closely related. Unlike many delphinids, common dolphins do not live in a matriarchal society. That being said, closely related individuals are usually found in similar geographical locations fairly consistently, providing evidence that this species displays site fidelity (at least in the Northeastern Atlantic). Male common dolphins display greater site fidelity in relation to their kin than females. Common dolphin pod structure often consists of nursery pods (which includes females and calves), bachelor pods (consisting of all males) and mixed groups of males and females, including sub-adults and calves. Genetic evidence seems to indicate that common dolphins live in fission-fusion societies, where dolphins form pods that are not necessarily stable and do not necessarily consist of related individuals. It is not known if common dolphins form lifelong bonds with other individuals like the long-term male alliances seen in bottlenose dolphins.

There is some evidence that common dolphins use signature whistles, similar to that of the bottlenose dolphin. These whistles are believed to serve as an acoustic label, and provide identification information similar to that of a name. It takes approximately 1 year for a calf to learn its signature whistle after which it remains stable for the rest of a dolphin's life. Off South Africa, as many as 29 common dolphin signature whistle types were detected. However, it was difficult to determine if each dolphin had its own signature whistle due to the vast number of dolphins present (over 1,000) and anthropogenic background noise. Additionally, considering the vast number of dolphins present and taking into account their feeding and diving behavior, it appears that common dolphin signature whistles are also used for group cohesion. Another hypothesis for the function of signature whistles is that they serve as a beacon for lost individuals.

=== Interspecific relations ===
Common dolphins sometimes associate with other dolphin species, such as pilot whales. In the Gulf of Corinth, common dolphins frequently display mixed species association, especially with striped and Risso's dolphins. Over one third of all dolphin sightings in this Gulf consisted of mixed species associations that partially consisted of common dolphins. In mixed species associations, the ratio of striped to common dolphins ranged from 6:1 to 11:1. When Risso's dolphins were present (there would usually be only one or two individuals), it appeared that many of their scars were the result of interactions with striped and spinner dolphins. In many of the interactions, the Risso's dolphins would chase and herd the common dolphins toward the boat, while the common dolphins would try and swim under the Risso's dolphins. When groups of common and striped dolphins would charge at each other, the Risso's dolphin would chase the striped dolphins. Sometimes these interactions appeared to be playful, and at other times aggressive. Synchronized swimming and surfacing were commonly observed. These interactions take place in the deepest part of the Gulf, furthest from shore, and usually consist of a total of about 60 dolphins from all three species.

There have been confirmed cases of hybridization between striped and common dolphins in this region, with 15 confirmed cases of such hybrids. Genetic and observational evidence has demonstrated that the hybrids are fertile and are capable of not only reproducing with other hybrids, but are capable of reproducing with each of the parent species. Striped dolphins have been known to mate with other dolphins, as the Clymene dolphin is the result of hybrid speciation between striped and spinner dolphins. However, this is unlikely to happen with common dolphins, as their population in the Gulf of Corinth is too low. There is one confirmed case of a wild hybrid between a bottlenose and common dolphin in southern Spain, an important feeding ground for both species. The mother was a female bottlenose dolphin (dubbed Billie) who had spent 10 years in a common dolphin pod. Billie was observed assisting common calves reach the surface three different times and would babysit the calves after the mother went through labor. The length of the calf was similar to that of a bottlenose dolphin calf, with the lateral stripes and coloration of a common dolphin. The calf was seen with its mother almost daily on dolphin-watching tours among a nursery pod of common dolphins which also contained some immature striped dolphins. Sightings of the calf took place when temperatures were between 14 and 26 °C (57 and 79 °F). The calf was mainly observed swimming alongside the mother and was seen rubbing its head on its mother, jumping backwards over its mother and engaging in flipper-to flipper, belly-to flipper and belly-to belly contact. Common dolphins and bottlenose dolphins are also known to interbreed in captivity. One of these hybrids has been bred back to a bottlenose dolphin, demonstrating such hybrids are fertile.

Common dolphins have been observed bow riding on both baleen whales and boats. They are fast swimmers, and breaching behavior and aerial acrobatics are common with this species. They are known to display altruistic behaviors to support injured members.

Common dolphins have a varied diet consisting of many species of fish and squid. This includes both mesopelagic species and epipelagic schooling species. They have been recorded to make dives up to 200 metres (660 ft) deep.

=== Reproduction ===
The short-beaked common dolphin has a gestation period of 10 to 11 months. The newborn calf has a length of 70 to 100 centimetres (2.3 to 3.3 ft) and weighs about 10 kilograms (22 lb). For the Black Sea population, weaning occurs at between five and six months, but occurs later (up to about 19 months) in other areas. Typical interbirth interval ranges from one year for the Black Sea population to three years for eastern Pacific Ocean populations. Age of sexual maturity also varies by location, but can range between 2 and 7 years for females and 3 and 12 years for males. No evidence exists of any major reproductive differences between the two forms.

== Relation to humans ==
=== Captivity ===
Common dolphins are not common in captivity. Despite this, on multiple occasions, a beached common dolphin in California was nursed back to health at SeaWorld San Diego, but deemed unfit to release back to the ocean. These common dolphins remained at SeaWorld with the bottlenose dolphin exhibit. On one occasion, a male common dolphin managed to impregnate one of the female bottlenose dolphins in the exhibit, leading to four hybrid births. One of the resulting common dolphin/bottlenose dolphin hybrids remained at SeaWorld, San Diego (alternately under the name Cindy or Bullet) while the other (named CJ) was kept at Discovery Cove, and was moved to SeaWorld Orlando in 2016. In 2024, the species returned to SeaWorld San Diego after a pair of rescued common dolphins were stranded on local beaches. Despite serious injuries and malnutrition, both survived, and due to their young age and necessary recovery they were deemed unreleasable. They were named Cardiff and Chance and now reside permanently at the park.

Other than at SeaWorld, at least 90 common dolphins are known to have been captured from the wild and kept in captivity. Captured common dolphins are said to be difficult to keep in captivity.

The behavior of captive common dolphins is not very well studied. However, a study was conducted in New Zealand of common dolphins reacting to swimmers at Marineland of New Zealand. The common dolphins retreated to the refuge center of the pool, where swimmers were not allowed. They did not leave the refuge section until the swimmers left. The dolphins also surfaced much more frequently, which is a possible indicator of stress. Aggressive and playful behavior among the dolphins decreased when swimmers were present. This behavior is consistent with wild common dolphins off of New Zealand, as they actively avoid swimmers.

=== Mass stranding events ===
On June 8, 2009, a mass-stranding event (MSE) occurred in Falmouth Bay, Cornwall, United Kingdom. It is believed the MSE was likely caused by naval involvement, as all other factors which cause MSEs in cetaceans appear unlikely to have influenced the event. During the event, 26 common dolphins washed ashore, and about the same number floated back out to sea. There were three other MSEs in the UK before this event, all of unknown cause, from the years 1915 to 1938, but with what are believed to be lower counts of stranded dolphins.

=== Conservation ===
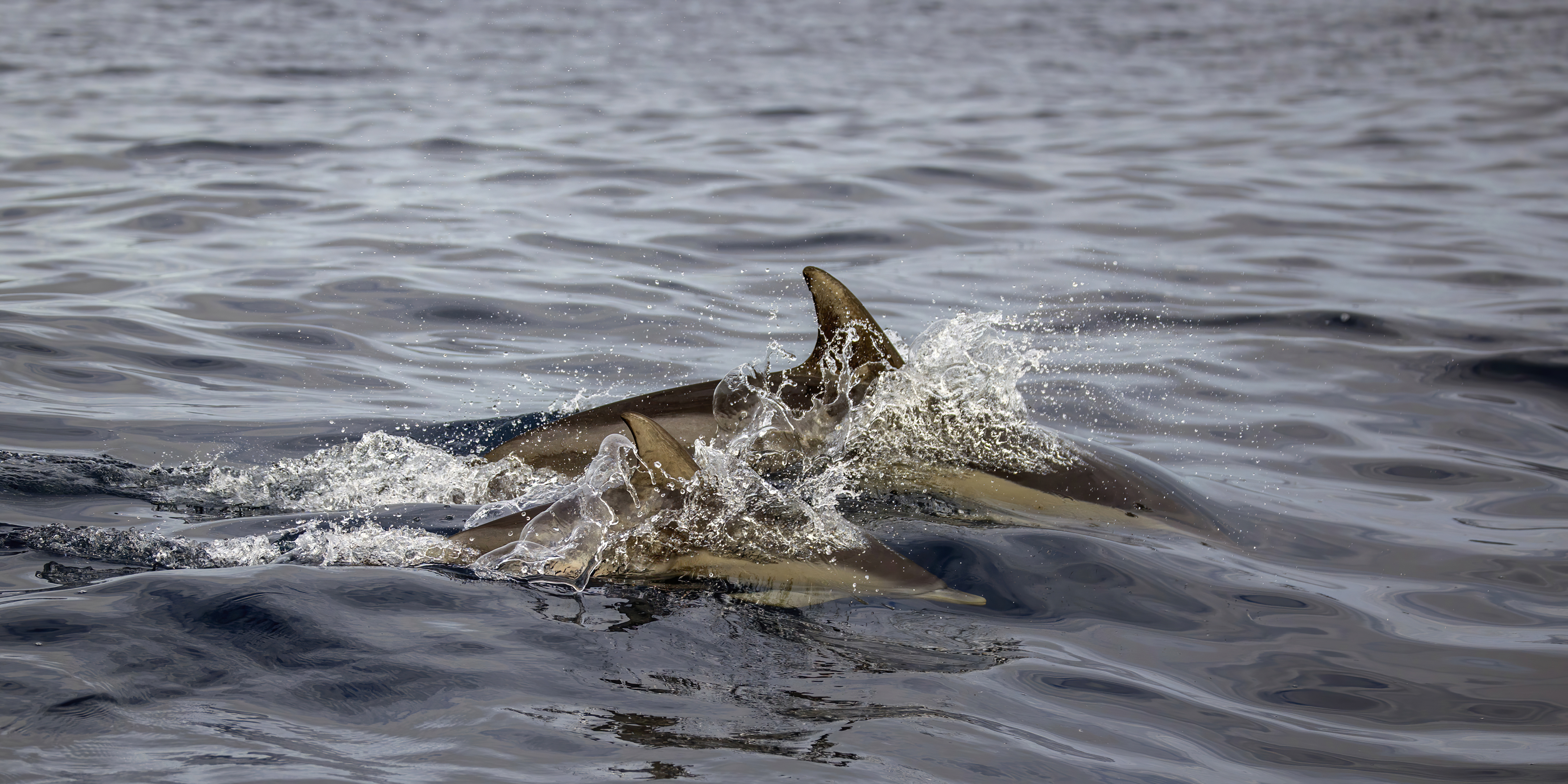
Adult and juvenile off Sagres, Portugal

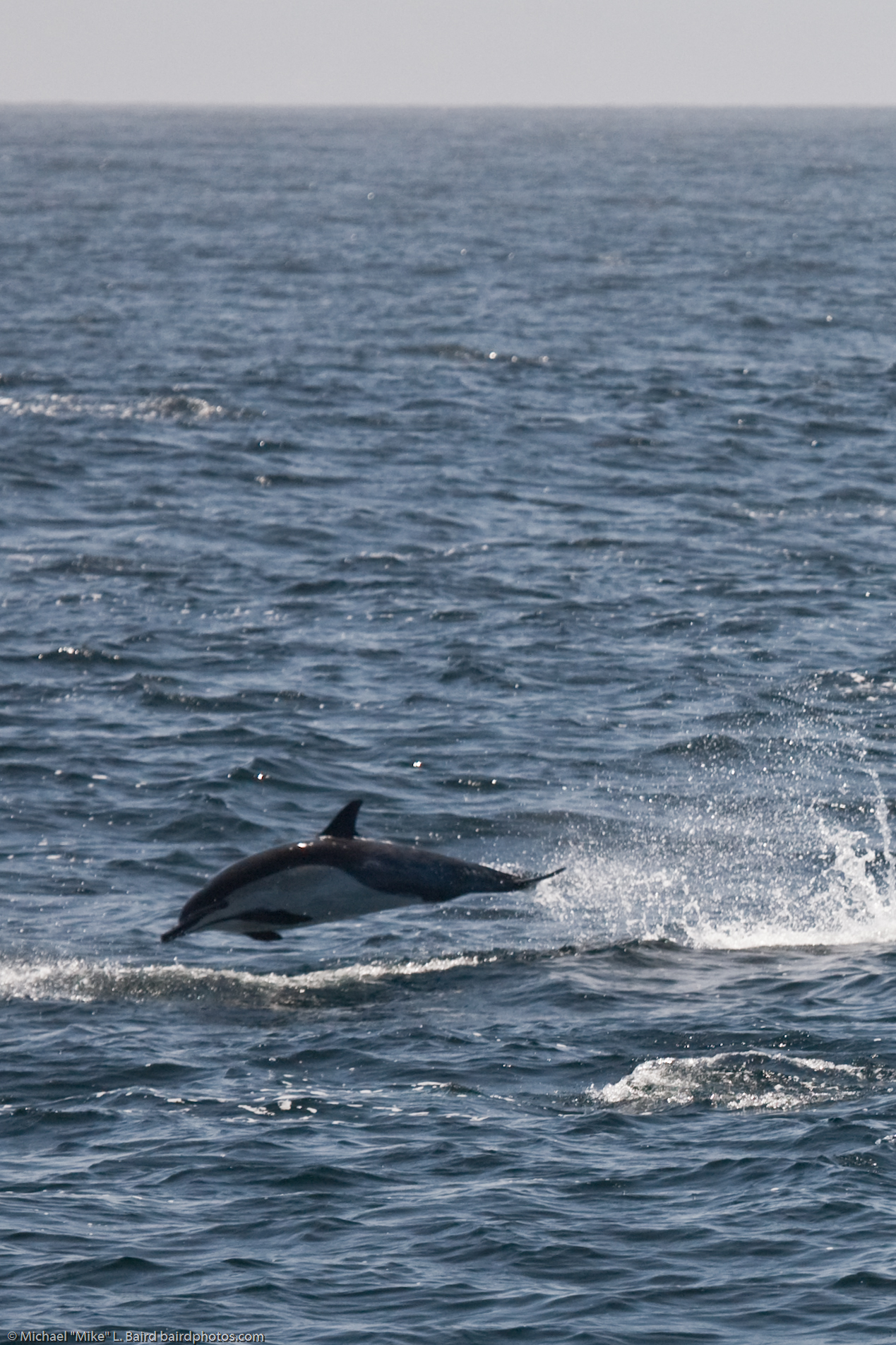
A common dolphin jumping off Morro Bay Nature Reserve

The common dolphin is probably the most abundant cetacean species on the planet, and the overall species is listed as least concern on the IUCN Red List, indicating that it is in no danger of extinction. Abundance has been estimated for most major portions of the species range in the Northern Hemisphere, but only for a few places in the Southern Hemisphere. In the Pacific Ocean, there are an estimated 1,428,000 off Japan and in the temperate central Pacific Ocean, 969,000 off the U.S. west coast (Carretta et al. 2019); and 2,963,000 in the eastern tropical Pacific. In the Atlantic Ocean, 70,000 are estimated for the western Atlantic Ocean (Waring et al. 2019); 467,000 for European waters; more than 19,400 for the Mediterranean Sea; and several tens of thousands for the Black Sea. In the southern part of the Indo-Pacific Ocean, there are an estimated 20,000-22,000 common dolphins in a small portion of southern Australia (Bilgmann et al. 2017), and 15,000-20,000 off southern Africa. There are no estimates for the population of dolphins in the northern Indian Ocean. Taken together, these estimates suggest that well over six million common dolphins inhabit the World's oceans.

Common dolphins face a mixture of threats due to human influence. Moderate levels of metal pollutants, which are thought to negatively impact dolphin health, have been measured in some populations. Populations have been hunted off the coast of Peru for use as food and shark bait. In most other areas, the dolphins have not been hunted directly. Several thousand individuals have been caught in industrial trawler nets throughout their range.

Bycatch is the main threat that common dolphins face today. Short-beaked common dolphins are taken as cetacean bycatch the most in all of Europe, given that they are the most abundant dolphin in the Eastern Atlantic. About 1000 short-beaked common dolphins are bycaught in the North Atlantic each year by either tuna drift, trawling and gillnetting. Common dolphin bycatch is a particularly important issue in Galicia, via trawler fishing. The bycatch of short beaked dolphins in Galicia from May to September from 2001 to 2002, consisted of 394 individuals annually. Depth was an important factor in bycatch, as incidental capture mostly took place along the continental shelf in water less than 300 metres (980 ft) deep. Very few entrapments took place when the depth exceeded 300 m. Time of day was also important as most dolphins became trapped in trawling nets at night (most active feeding takes place at night). Most of the dolphins captured were males and had a mean age of 13±4.4 years. It is believed that the reason why the vast majority of bycatch consisted of males is because bachelor pods appear to be particularly abundant in Galicia from the May–October season. This fact reinforces the hypothesis that common dolphins may be sexually segregated in the Northeast Atlantic. If there was a ban on fishing in Galicia in waters less than 250 m deep, and if there were seasonal closures, it is estimated that 78% of the dolphins would not have been caught. In the Western North Atlantic, dolphins are vulnerable to driftnet fishing targeting swordfish, with the number of males being caught as bycatch, doubling the number of females. It was also found from stranding samples that males tend to strand more. This provides evidence of sex-based habitat partitioning or pod congregation.

Common dolphins were abundant in the western Mediterranean Sea until the 1960s but occurrences there have tailed off rapidly. The reasons are not well understood, but are believed to be due to extensive human activity in the area. In the US, they are a protected species and sometimes are caught by accident in some trawler nets as by-catch, though despite this they are still quite common throughout their range. Despite these potential threats, the short-beaked common dolphin is listed as least concern on the IUCN Red List, and the long-beaked common dolphin is listed as data deficient.

The short-beaked common dolphin Delphinus delphis is listed globally on Appendix II of the Convention on the Conservation of Migratory Species of Wild Animals (CMS). As amended by the Conference of the Parties in 1985, 1988, 1991, 1994, 1997, 1999, 2002, 2005 and 2008. Effective: 5 March 2009 of the Convention on the Conservation of Migratory Species of Wild Animals (CMS) as it has an unfavourable conservation status or would benefit significantly from international co-operation organised by tailored agreements. The Mediterranean population of the short-beaked common dolphin is also listed on Appendix I, as this population has been categorized as being in danger of extinction throughout all or a significant proportion of their range and CMS Parties strive towards strictly protecting these animals, conserving or restoring the places where they live, mitigating obstacles to migration and controlling other factors that might endanger them. In addition, the species is also covered by the Agreement on the Conservation of Small Cetaceans of the Baltic, North East Atlantic, Irish and North Seas (ASCOBANS) and the Agreement on the Conservation of Cetaceans in the Black Sea, Mediterranean Sea and Contiguous Atlantic Area (ACCOBAMS).

== See also ==
- List of cetaceans
- Marine biology
