= Charles Fleming Award for Environmental Achievement =

Environmental science award in New Zealand

Fleming Award
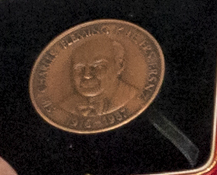
- Description: Recognizing protection, maintenance, or understanding of the environment
- Country: New Zealand
- Presented by: Royal Society Te Apārangi
- Rewards: Medal, cash prize, and public lecture tour

The Fleming Award is an environmental science award bestowed every three years by the Royal Society of New Zealand, which recognises "protection, maintenance, management, improvement or understanding of the environment, in particular the sustainable management of the New Zealand environment". It comprises a medal, a cash prize, and a public lecture tour in the year following the award.

The award was established in 1988 to commemorate the life and work of conservationist, scientist, and former President of the RSNZ Sir Charles Fleming.

== Recipients ==
Source: Royal Society of New Zealand

- 1989: Don Merton and the Royal Forest and Bird Protection Society of New Zealand
- 1992: Ian A. E. Atkinson
- 1995: Brian Molloy
- 1998: David A. Thom
- 2001: John Craig
- 2004: Stephen Dawson and Elisabeth Slooten (jointly)
- 2007: Mick Clout
- 2010: Sir Alan Mark
- 2013: Mike Joy
- 2016: Bruce Clarkson
- 2019: David Towns
- 2022: Ann Brower

== See also ==
- List of environmental awards
