= Marineland of New Zealand =

Marine mammal park in Napier, New Zealand (1965–2008)

- Marineland's logo

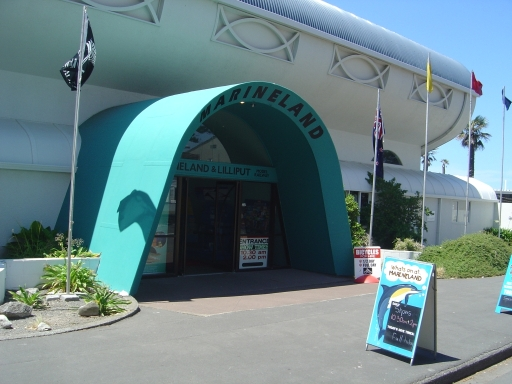
- Entrance on Marine Parade, 2008
- Interactive map of Marineland of New Zealand
- 39.494662°S 176.919161°E
- Date opened: 29 January 1965
- Date closed: September 2008
- Location: Marine Parade, Napier, New Zealand
- Owner: Napier City Council
- Website: http://www.marineland.co.nz

Marineland of New Zealand was a marine mammal park in Napier, New Zealand, that opened in 1965 and closed to the public in 2008. It housed several species of native and introduced marine wildlife, most notably common dolphins.

== History ==
The history of Marineland began in 1964 when an Auckland architectural firm was commissioned by Napier City Council under mayor Peter Tait to design an aquarium and dolphin pool. In late January 1965 Marineland caught its first common dolphin, Daphne, and the facility opened two days later. In 1969, two dolphins died when vandals broke in and fed them nails.

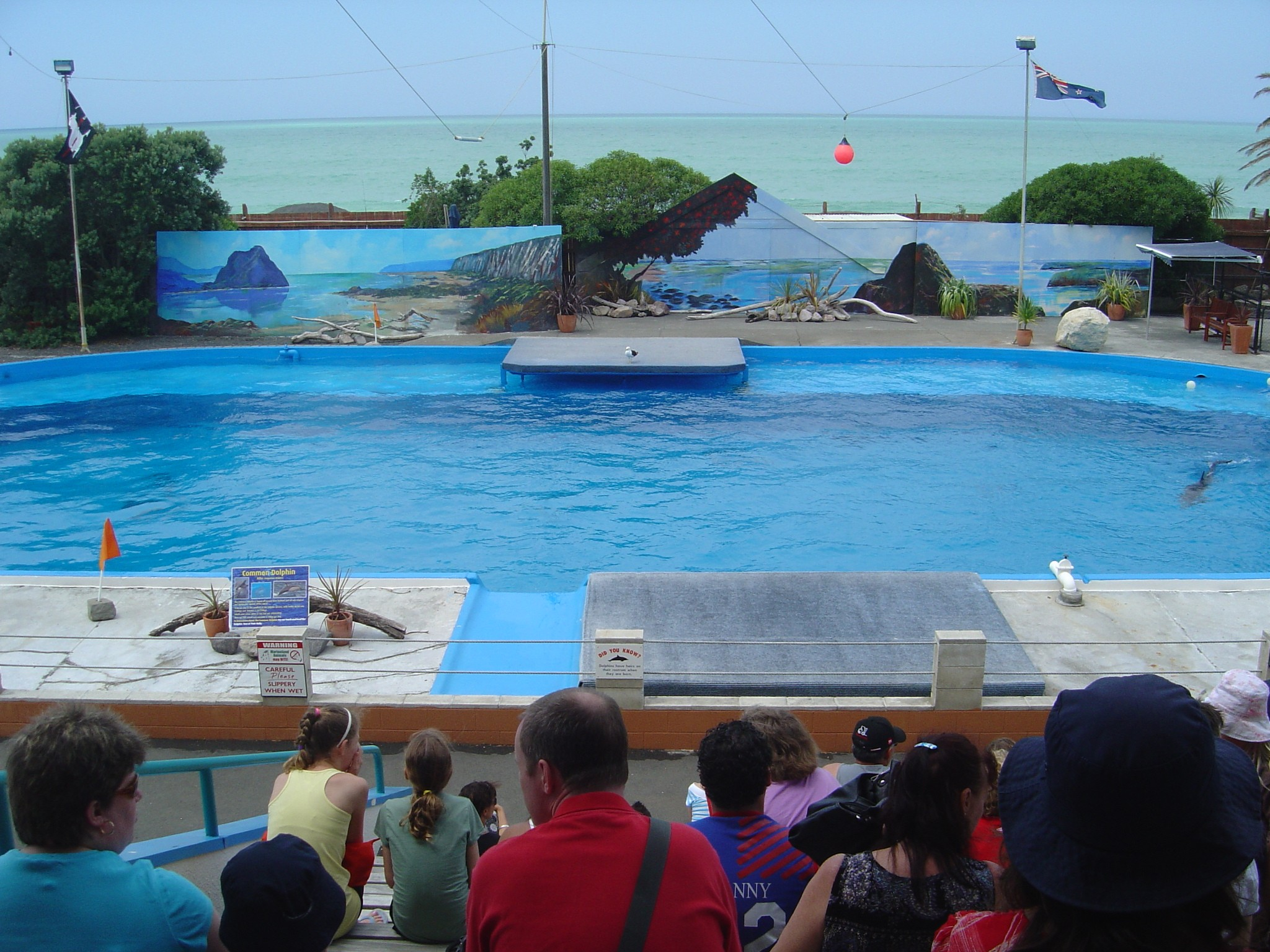
The main tank at Marineland in 2008

By the end of the 1960s the site had exhibited dusky dolphins, California sea lions, leopard seals and New Zealand fur seals. In the 1970s, Marineland welcomed bottlenose dolphins, Weddell seals, and small clawed otters that came from Melbourne Zoo.

In the 1980s and 1990s, significant development occurred with the construction of a grandstand and a new Marine Education Centre with funding from New Zealand Lotteries Commission grant In 1992, a very popular "Swim With Dolphins" programme was established.

Marineland closed to the public in September 2008 when Kelly, the last remaining dolphin, died. Many of the animals and staff were transferred to National Aquarium of New Zealand, also in Napier. In September 2013, Napier City Council announced that Marineland was to be demolished and replaced with a skatepark, known as Bay Skate.

== Notable animals ==
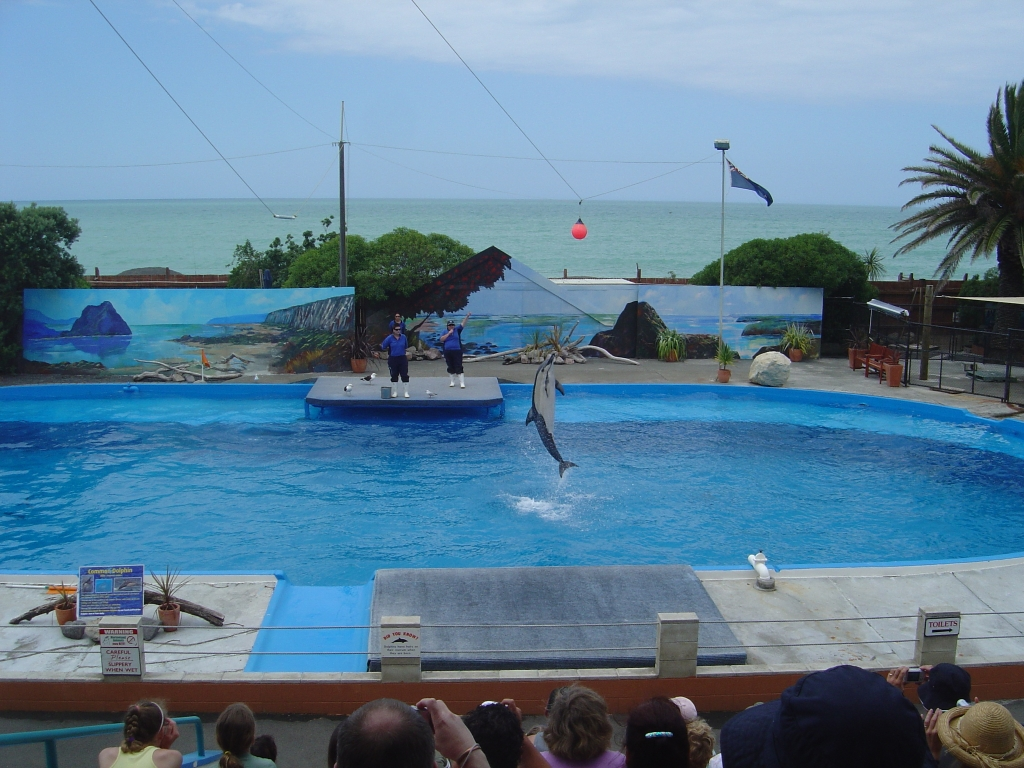
Kelly the common dolphin performing a spinning trick during a show

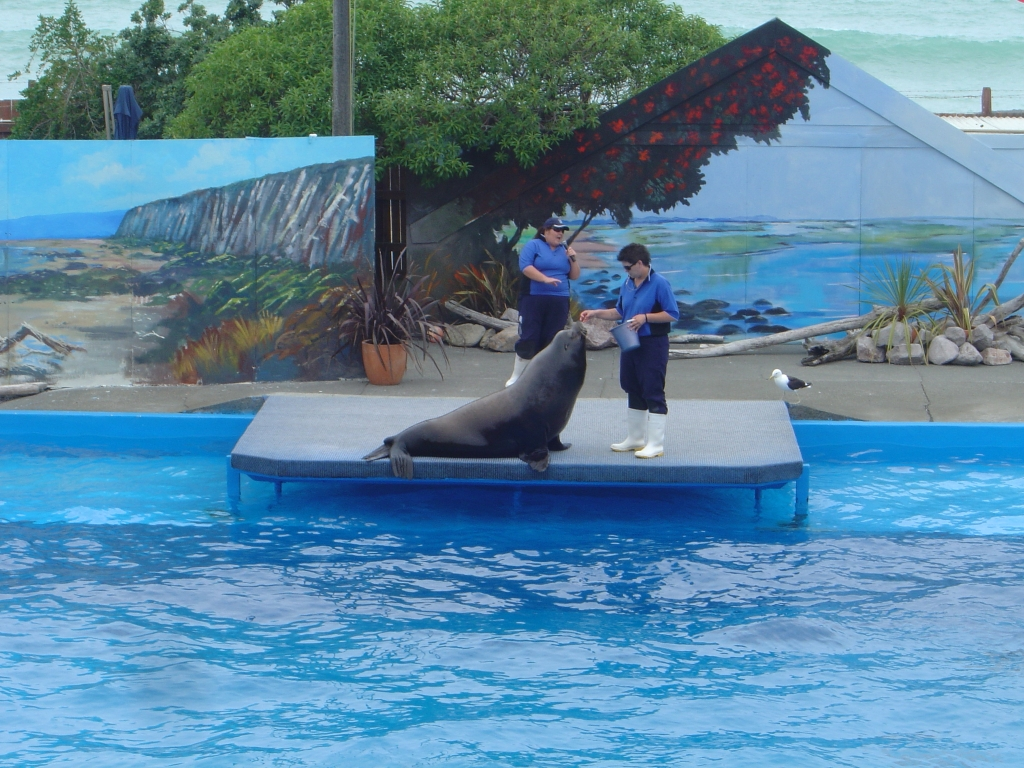
A male California sea lion during a performance

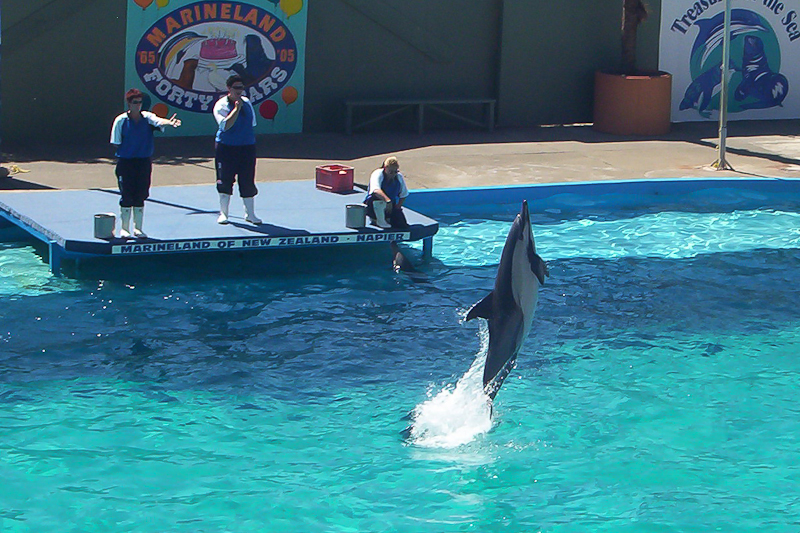
Kelly the dolphin performing

Marineland was notable for housing common dolphins, which are kept less often in captivity than bottlenose dolphins. The last two dolphins kept by Marineland, Kelly and Shona, arrived in 1974. Shona died in 2006 and Kelly died on 11 September 2008, possibly due to stomach cancer. Her death triggered the closure of Marineland to the public.

In addition to the dolphins, Marineland also housed New Zealand fur seals, California sea lions, and a leopard seal. Many of the animals kept at Marineland were either brought in sick or injured, or were bred from animals that were brought to the park sick and injured. Other animals were also acquired from other zoos, including Sea Life Park in Hawaii.

Marineland was also home to a breeding colony of little penguins established from sick and injured birds, which were moved to the National Aquarium. A wide range of birds were also kept at Marineland over the years, including Australasian gannets and a sulphur crested cockatoo known as Bobby.

== False reports about fur seal origins ==
The final manager of Marineland, Gary Macdonald, resigned on 18 November 2009, after 32 years as manager, after an investigation found documents had been falsified to state that three fur seal pups born in the wild had been born at Marineland. Napier City Council chief executive Neil Taylor said the investigations showed three wild seal pups were documented as being born in Marineland, enabling the facility to keep them rather than release the animals back to the wild. The council probe revealed false declarations were filed in 1996, 2006, and 2007, stating in all cases that the pups had arrived malnourished, harassed, or at risk for treatment. The Department of Conservation completed an investigation but decided against prosecution of Marineland, satisfied with Macdonald's resignation.
