= Trecia Wouldes =

Professor of psychological medicine in New Zealand

Academic background
- Theses: Superstitious behavior: attribution of negative and positive events (1991); Methadone maintenance during pregnancy : the consequences of low-dose vs high-dose for the fetus, the neonate and the infant (2001)

Academic work
- Institutions: University of Auckland

Trecia Ann Wouldes (born 1946) is a New Zealand academic, and is a full professor in the Department of Psychological Medicine at the University of Auckland, specialising in the developmental effects of drug exposure in pregnancy.

== Academic career ==
Wouldes completed an MA in psychology in 1991, and a PhD titled Methadone maintenance during pregnancy: the consequences of low-dose vs high-dose for the fetus, the neonate and the infant, both at the University of Auckland. Wouldes then joined the faculty of the university, rising to full professor in 2021.

Wouldes is a developmental scientist, and has researched the effect on infants of methamphetamine and methadone use during pregnancy. She is part of the IDEAL Study, a collaboration with researchers at Brown University and several other US universities to investigate the effects of P use on infant development, and since 2005 has been the study's director. She has also collaborated with researchers at Victoria University of Wellington and Ngāti Pāhauwera to investigate the treatment of methamphetamine dependence in Māori women.

Wouldes is involved in the Liggins Institute, where she was part of an award-winning team, led by Professor Jane Harding, investigating gestational diabetes and neonatal hypoglycaemia. Wouldes is also part of an international study to look at resilience in migrant youth.

As of 2024, Wouldes is Associate Dean of Equity for the Faculty of Medical and Health Sciences, and head of the Department of Psychological Medicine.

== Selected works ==
- Janet A Rowan; Rush, Elaine Carolyn; Victor Obolonkin; Malcolm Battin; Trecia Wouldes; William M Hague (2011). "Metformin in gestational diabetes: the offspring follow-up (MiG TOFU): body composition at 2 years of age". Diabetes Care. 34 (10): 2279–2284. doi:10.2337/dc11-0660. PMC 3177748. PMID 21949222. Wikidata Q30407478.
- Carol Chelimo; Trecia A Wouldes; Linda D Cameron; J Mark Elwood (2012). "Risk factors for and prevention of human papillomaviruses (HPV), genital warts and cervical cancer". Journal of Infection. 66 (3): 207–217. doi:10.1016/j.jinf.2012.10.024. PMID 23103285. Wikidata Q38055975.
- Christopher J. D. McKinlay; Jane M. Alsweiler; Judith M. Ansell; et al. (2015). "Neonatal Glycemia and Neurodevelopmental Outcomes at 2 Years". The New England Journal of Medicine. 373 (16): 1507–1518. doi:10.1056/nejmoa1504909. PMC 4646166. PMID 26465984. Wikidata Q36283260.
- J Stanton; Simpson, Alexander; Trecia Ann Wouldes (2000). "A qualitative study of filicide by mentally ill mothers". Child Abuse & Neglect. 24 (11): 1451–1460. doi:10.1016/s0145-2134(00)00198-8. PMID 11128176. Wikidata Q48693574.
- Trecia Ann Wouldes; Malcolm Battin; Suzette Coat; Rush, Elaine Carolyn; William M Hague; Janet A Rowan (2016). "Neurodevelopmental outcome at 2 years in offspring of women randomised to metformin or insulin treatment for gestational diabetes". Archives of Disease in Childhood. Fetal and Neonatal Edition. 101 (6): F488–F493. doi:10.1136/archdischild-2015-309602. PMID 26912348. Wikidata Q39971043.
- Trecia Wouldes; Linda L Lagasse; Sheridan, Janie; Lester, Barry (2004). "Maternal methamphetamine use during pregnancy and child outcome: what do we know?". The New Zealand Medical Journal. 117 (1206): U1180. PMID 15570349. Wikidata Q45166978.
