= Elizabeth Franz (scientist) =

New Zealand neuroscientist

Liz Franz
- Born: Elizabeth Anna Franz
- Education: Purdue University (MSc); UC Berkeley (PhD)
- Scientific career
- Fields: Bimanual coordination
- Workplaces: University of Otago
- Thesis: An examination of the spatial and temporal limitations in bimanual coordination. (1988)

Elizabeth Anna 'Liz' Franz is a New Zealand academic neuroscientist. Her current research explores psychological and neural processes associated with the action system. Since 2012, she has been a full professor at the University of Otago.

== Academic career ==
After a 1988 MSc titled 'An examination of the spatial and temporal limitations in bimanual coordination.' at Purdue University and further PhD and post-docs at UC Berkeley, Franz moved to the University of Otago in 1997, rising to full professor.

Since 2004, Franz has directed the Cognitive Science Programme at Otago. She obtained grants from the Marsden Fund of the Royal Society of New Zealand in 2011 and 2017 to investigate the genetics and neural processes underlying independent hand dexterity.

In addition, Franz conducts research into effects of skilled actions such as table tennis in people with Parkinson's disease, and is an international speaker on effects of exercise on brain health.

== Personal life ==
In 2018, Franz started playing table tennis, playing with her right hand. After an accident in 2019 involving her right hand, she taught herself to play left-handed. She attends competitions in New Zealand and internationally, including a 2022 tournament and training camp in Houston, Texas. Whilst attending a North Island championship, she was approached by the New Zealand paralympics team.

Prior to taking up table tennis, she was an active runner.

== Selected works ==
- Franz, Elizabeth A., Howard N. Zelaznik, and George P. McCabe. "Spatial topological constraints in a bimanual task." Acta Psychologica 77, no. 2 (1991): 137–151.
- Franz, Elizabeth A., James C. Eliassen, Richard B. Ivry, and Michael S. Gazzaniga. "Dissociation of spatial and temporal coupling in the bimanual movements of callosotomy patients." Psychological Science 7, no. 5 (1996): 306–310.
- Franz, Elizabeth A., Howard N. Zelaznik, Stephan Swinnen, and Charles Walter. "Spatial conceptual influences on the coordination of bimanual actions: When a dual task becomes a single task." Journal of Motor Behavior 33, no. 1 (2001): 103–112.
- Franz, Elizabeth A., and V. S. Ramachandran. "Bimanual coupling in amputees with phantom limbs." Nature Neuroscience 1, no. 6 (1998): 443.
- Zhang, Y., Zhu, H., & Franz, E. (2025). Physical activity indexed using table tennis skills modulates the neural dynamics of involuntary retrieval of negative memories. Experimental Brain Research, 243, 17. doi: 10.1007/s00221-024-06948-y
- Lu, X., Franz, E. A., Robertson, S. P., & Markie, D. (2024). Aberrant connectivity of the lateralized readiness system in non-syndromic Congenital Mirror Movements. Clinical Neurophysiology.Nov:167:61-73. doi: 10.1016/j.clinph.2024.08.018. Epub 2024 Aug 30.
- Miasnikova, A., & Franz, E. A. (2022). Brain dynamics in alpha and beta frequencies underlies response activation during readiness of goal-directed hand movement. Neuroscience Research, 180, 36-47. doi: 10.1016/j.neures.2022.03.004
- Franz, E. A. (2020). Characterizing the phenotypes of congenital mirror movements and other rare genetic disorders. Developmental Medicine & Child Neurology, 62(6), 669. doi: 10.1111/dmcn.14509
- Franz, E. A. (2025). Exercise is neuroprotection: But participation is the imperative [Perspective]. Exploration of Neuroprotective Therapy, 5, 1004115. doi: 10.37349/ent.2025.1004115
- Miasnikova, A. S., & Franz, E. A. (2025). Phase coupling in the beta and gamma frequencies of motor cortex activity is elevated in people with Parkinson's disease when medication is temporarily withheld. NeuroReport, 36(17), 1025-1030. doi: 10.1097/wnr.0000000000002223
- Lu, X., Franz, E. A., Robertson, S. P., & Markie, D. (2026). Altered corpus callosum microstructure in people with non-syndromic congenital mirror movements (CMM). Clinical Neurophysiology, 186, 211861. doi: 10.1016/j.clinph.2026.2111861
