= Emerging Themes in Epidemiology =

Peer reviewed journal on Public Health

- Discipline: Epidemiology
- Language: English
- Edited by: Clarence Tam

Publication details
- History: 2009-present
- Publisher: BioMed Central on behalf of the London School of Hygiene and Tropical Medicine

Standard abbreviations
- ISO 4: Emerg. Themes Epidemiol.

Indexing
- ISSN: 1742-7622

Links
- Journal homepage

Emerging Themes in Epidemiology is an online open access peer-reviewed medical journal. It is managed by current doctoral students and recent PhD graduates in the United Kingdom and Singapore. The journal is based at the London School of Hygiene and Tropical Medicine and is published by BioMed Central.

== Principles ==
The journal has three guiding principles:

1. That more fundamental discussion is needed of the theoretical frameworks that underpin the field of epidemiology, as well as the methodological and practical challenges of conducting epidemiological research
2. That scientific knowledge, a public good that results mainly from publicly funded research, should be made freely available through Open Access
3. That doctorate students should have an opportunity to contribute more directly to the scientific discourse by influencing what is published, while gaining experience in editing and publishing an academic journal

== Scope ==
The journal publishes articles related to any aspect of epidemiological research and practice, focusing on novel theoretical frameworks, methodological developments, causal inference, and epistemology. It does not generally consider reports of primary research, but publishes discursive pieces that comment critically on epidemiologic research and practice.

It also publishes special collections of articles with the aim of bringing attention to emerging themes in public health. The journal was launched with a series of articles on the role of epidemiology in conflict settings, in collaboration with authors from a number of academic and public health institutions, and humanitarian organizations. Since then, the journal has published articles focusing on migration and health and methods for health surveys in hard-to-reach populations.

== Editorial board ==
The journal's editor-in-chief is Clarence Tam (Saw Swee Hock School of Public Health).
