= Jane Koziol-McLain =

American-New Zealand nursing academic, specialising in domestic violence

- Education: Loyola University Chicago; University of Colorado
- Scientific career
- Fields: emergency medicine domestic violence
- Thesis: Breaking the silence: Screening for violence against women (1999)
- Website: http://www.aut.ac.nz/research/professors-at-aut/jane-koziol-mclain

Jane Koziol-McLain is an American-New Zealand nursing academic, specialising in domestic violence. She is a full professor at the Auckland University of Technology.

== Academic career ==
After an undergraduate at Loyola University Chicago, Koziol-McLain did a 1989 MSc titled 'Variations in orthostatic vital signs in selected emergency department patients'. She received a Master of Science at the University of Colorado Denver in 1989 and a PhD at the University of Colorado College of Nursing in 1999. After a post-doc fellowship at Johns Hopkins University, she moved to Auckland University of Technology, where she rose to professor in 2008.

Koziol-McLain's work, since her PhD, largely relates to screening and risk factors for domestic violence.

== Selected works ==
- Campbell, Jacquelyn C., Daniel Webster, Jane Koziol-McLain, Carolyn Block, Doris Campbell, Mary Ann Curry, Faye Gary et al. "Risk factors for femicide in abusive relationships: Results from a multisite case control study." American Journal of Public Health 93, number 7 (2003): pages 1089–1097.
- Abbott, Jean, Robin Johnson, Jane Koziol-McLain, and Steven R. Lowenstein. "Domestic violence against women: incidence and prevalence in an emergency department population." JAMA 273, number 22 (1995): pages 1763–1767.
- Gilbert, Eric H., Steven R. Lowenstein, Jane Koziol-McLain, Diane C. Barta, and John Steiner. "Chart reviews in emergency medicine research: where are the methods?." Annals of Emergency Medicine 27, number 3 (1996): pages 305–308.
- Honigman, Benjamin, Mary Kay Theis, Jane Koziol-McLain, Robert Roach, Ray Yip, Charles Houston, and Lorna G. Moore. "Acute mountain sickness in a general tourist population at moderate altitudes." Annals of Internal Medicine 118, number 8 (1993): pages 587–592.
- Campbell, Jacquelyn C., Daniel W. Webster, Jane Koziol-McLain, Carolyn Rebecca Block, Doris Williams Campbell, Mary Ann Curry, Faye Gary et al. "Assessing risk factors for intimate partner homicide." National Institute of Justice Journal 250 (2003): pages 14–19.
