= Roy Harrison (entomologist) =

New Zealand entomologist (1918–2006)

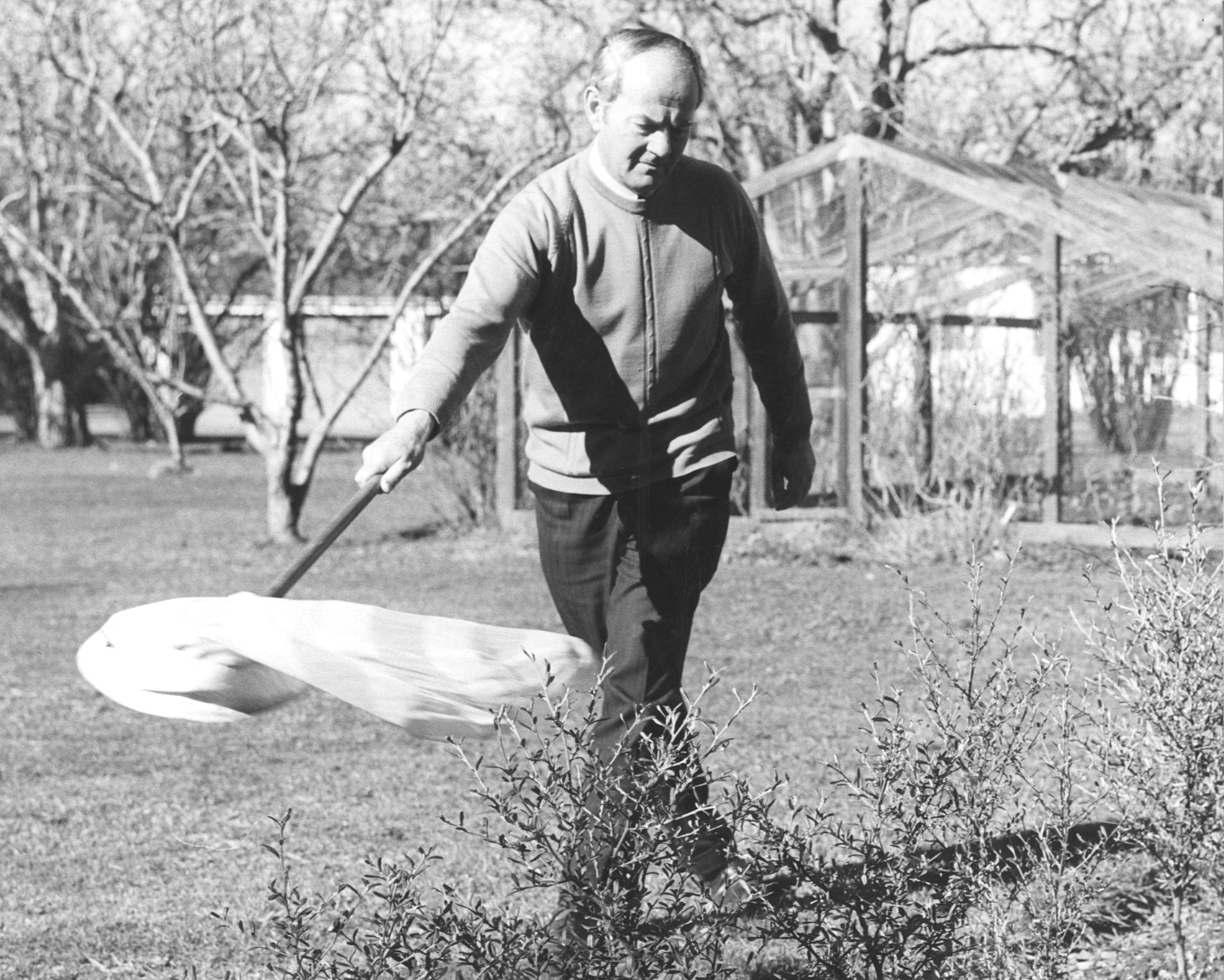
- Born: 1918; Auckland, New Zealand
- Died: 18 June 2006 (aged 87–88); Amberley, New Zealand
- Education: Auckland University College, Victoria University College
- Spouse: Marjory L Joll. (m. 1943)
- Children: 3
- Scientific career
- Fields: Entomology
- Workplaces: Lincoln University
- Theses: The embryology of Temnocephala novae-zealandiae Haswell (1947); Studies on Diptera (1959)

Roy Alexander Harrison (1918 – 18 June 2006) was a New Zealand entomologist who is best known for his extensive research on flies.

== Early life ==
Harrison was born in Auckland, New Zealand in 1918. He went to Avondale Primary School and completed his schooling at Mount Albert Grammar School. Harrison then studied at Auckland Teachers’ College to become a teacher. During this time and afterwards, he completed a BSc part time at Auckland University College.

After World War 2 began, he served in the army from 1941 until 1945 and rose to the rank of staff sergeant.

== Career ==
After completing his military service during World War 2, Harrison began working at the Department of Scientific and Industrial Research.

Harrison was one of the first members of the Entomological Society of New Zealand and served as its president from 1959 to 1961. He was also responsible for creating the societies 21st Anniversary Research Fund alongside Alan Lowe.

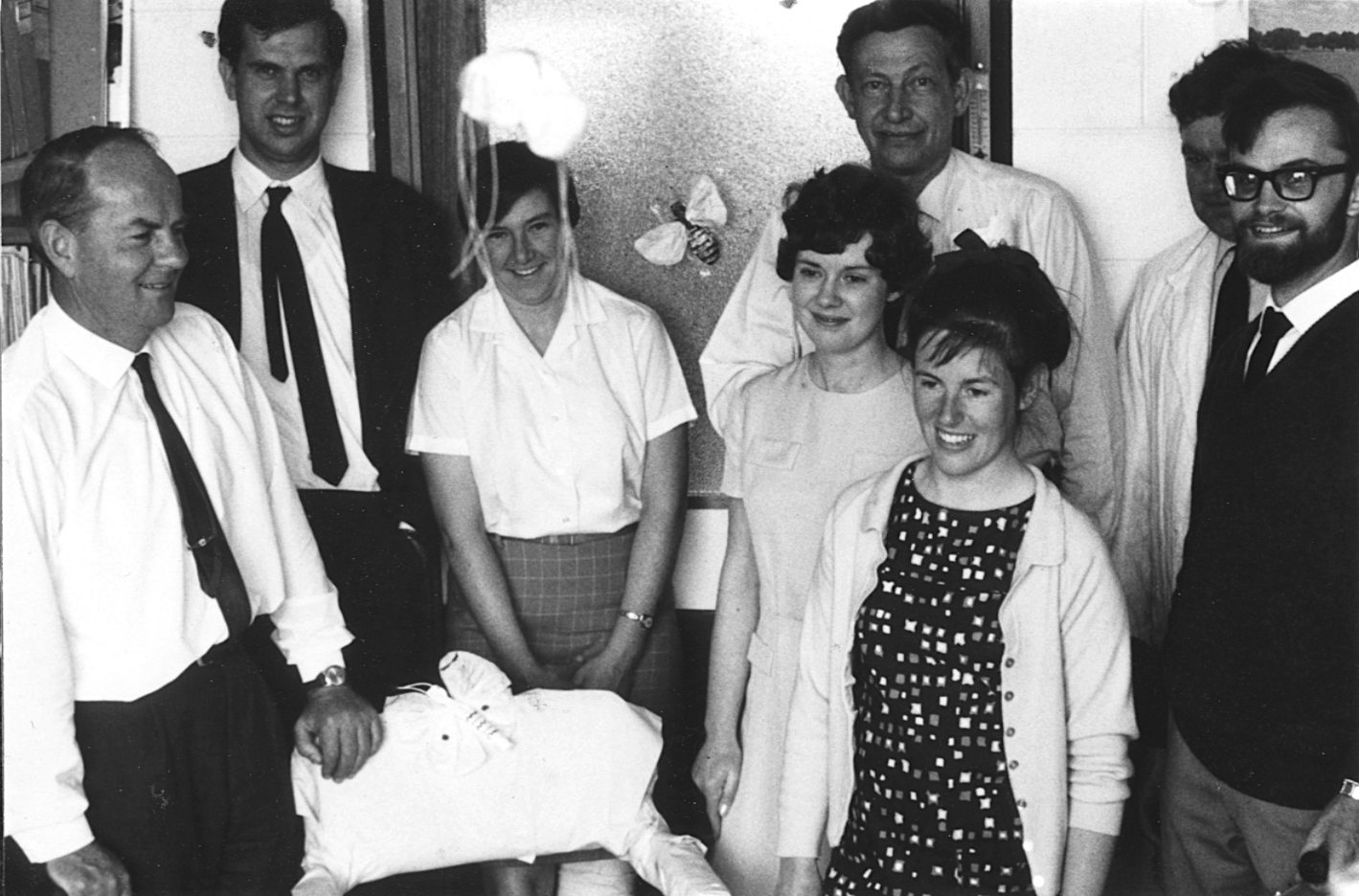
Roy Harrison (far left) celebrating becoming the Chair of Entomology at Lincoln College in 1969.

In 1961, Harrison became a senior lecturer at Lincoln University (then Lincoln College). In 1969 he was promoted to a professor and became the Chair of Entomology, which he remained as until his retirement in 1979.

Throughout his career, he published extensively on fly taxonomy and insect pest control. He also had numerous students, some of whom went on to become noted entomologists (such as Alan Lowe and Rod Macfarlane).

== Death ==
Harrison died on 18 June 2006 in Amberley, New Zealand.

== Species described ==
Harrison described around 61 new species. Some of which include:

- Brevicornu brunnea (Harrison, 1964)
- Dilophus alpinus Harrison, 1990
- Diplotoxa neozelandica Harrison, 1959
- Fenwickia affinis Harrison, 1959
- Minilimosina knightae (Harrison, 1959)
- Mycetophila campbellensis Harrison, 1964
- Phthitia thomasi (Harrison, 1959)
- Spilogona sorenseni (Harrison, 1955)
- Thoracochaeta zealandica (Harrison, 1959)
- Zygomyia submarginata Harrison, 1955

== Selected publications ==
- Harrison, R.A. (1947). Embryology of Temnocephala novaezealandiae Haswell. Nature 160 (4075): 798-799. https://doi.org/10.1038/160798B0
- Harrison, R.A. (1952). New Zealand Drosophilidae (Diptera). 1. Introduction and descriptions of domestic species of the genus Drosophila Fallen. Transactions and Proceedings of the Royal Society of New Zealand 79(3-4): 505-517.
- Harrison, R.A. (1955). The Diptera of Auckland and Campbell Islands Part 1. Records of the Dominion Museum Wellington 2(4): 205-231.
- Harrison, R.A. (1959). Acalypterate Diptera of New Zealand. New Zealand Department of Scientific and Industrial Research Bulletin 128. 382pp.
- Harrison, R.A. (1970). The present status of taxonomic entomology in New Zealand. Summing up. New Zealand Entomologist 4(3): 60-61. https://doi.org/10.1080/00779962.1970.9722919
- Harrison, R.A. (1990). Bibionidae (Insecta: Diptera). Fauna of New Zealand 20. https://doi.org/10.7931/J2/FNZ.20
