= Barbara Barratt =

New Zealand entomologist and biocontrol expert

- Other name: Barbara Ingeborg Patricia Barratt
- Education: Durham University
- Scientific career
- Workplaces: AgResearch
- Thesis: Studies on a sex pheromone in Stegobium paniceum (L.) (Coleoptera; Anobiidae) (1975)
- Doctoral advisor: Lewis Davies

Barbara Ingeborg Patricia Barratt is a New Zealand entomologist and biocontrol expert. In 2022, she was elected as fellow of the Royal Society Te Apārangi.

== Early life and education ==
Barratt was born in England and has recalled that an interest in science was influenced by her father and a teacher who took her on nature walks to collect "creepy crawlies". At this stage she knew she wanted to get involved in natural history, particularly involving insects. She completed her PhD at Durham University in 1975, with a thesis on the sex pheromones of the drugstore beetle. She arrived in New Zealand as a postdoctoral fellow in 1978.

== Honours and awards ==
In 2011 Barratt was elected as one of only twenty Fellows of the Entomological Society of New Zealand. Her nomination, written by Stephen Goldson and Rod Emberson, noted her pioneering biocontrol work, but also her contribution to the understanding of the impacts of agriculture and fire on native grassland ecosystems.

In March 2022 Barratt was elected as Fellow of the Royal Society Te Apārangi. The society said, "Barbara Barratt pioneered internationally relevant research into the biosafety of introduced biocontrol agents for insect pests, which is now being widely applied domestically and internationally. In the 1990s this was a new, contentious and complex aspect of applied ecology. A key example of impact is Barratt’s contribution to the identification and biosafety assessment of a parasitoid wasp for biocontrol of clover root weevil. Through her vision and determination, Barratt has become a leader in the field, both in New Zealand and internationally."

Barratt is president of the International Organisation for Biocontrol. She is an honorary Professor at the University of Otago.
