= Elaine Rush =

New Zealand born Professor of Nutrition

Elaine Rush MNZM
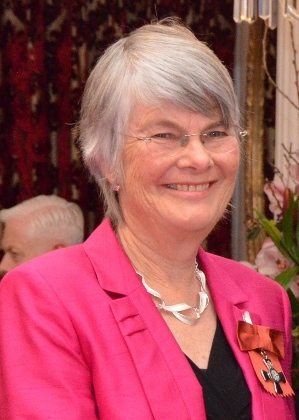
- Rush following her investiture in 2014
- Occupation: Nutritionist

Academic background
- Education: University of Auckland

Professor Emeritus Elaine Carolyn Rush, MNZM, is a Professor of Nutrition at Auckland University of Technology. In 2014 she was appointed as a Member of the New Zealand Order of Merit for her services to health and in 2019 she was appointed Professor Emeritus in recognition of her long and distinguished service to the University.

== Research ==
Her research in the measurement of body composition, energy expenditure, physical activity, nutrition and risk factors for disease, as well as her interest in ethnic differences in health have produced over 270 publications.

She is involved with projects to improve health outcomes in children, including those whose mothers had gestational diabetes during pregnancy. She is also involved in the longitudinal Pacific Island Family study, which is tracking over 1,000 Pacific Island children from birth.

== Positions ==
Rush was the scientific director of the New Zealand Nutrition Foundation from 2006 to 2013. She also serves on the Councils of a number of nutrition and obesity organisations and is the New Zealand representative for the World Obesity Federation. She has been an expert consultant for the World Health Organization and the International Atomic Energy Agency as well as adjunct professor at the Cork Institute of Technology.
