= Liz Slooten =

New Zealand zoologist

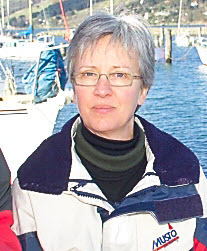
- Slooten in 2008
- Born: Elisabeth Slooten
- Education: University of Canterbury
- Scientific career
- Workplaces: University of Otago
- Thesis: Population biology, social organization and behaviour of Hector's Dolphins (1990)

Elisabeth Slooten is a New Zealand zoology academic. She is currently a full professor at the University of Otago.

== Biography ==
After secondary school in the Netherlands and a BSc and MSc in marine biology at the University of Auckland, Slooten completed a 1990 PhD from the University of Canterbury entitled Population biology, social organization and behaviour of Hector's Dolphins. Moving to the University of Otago for an extended period, she rose to the rank of full professor in 2015.

In 2004, Slooten and Steve Dawson won the Charles Fleming Award for environmental achievement from the Royal Society of New Zealand. In 2017, Slooten was selected as one of the Royal Society Te Apārangi's "150 women in 150 words", celebrating the contributions of women to knowledge in New Zealand.

Slooten's partner, Steve Dawson, is a professor of marine biology at Otago.

== Selected works ==
- Lusseau, David; Slooten, Liz; Currey, Rohan J. C. (2006). "Unsustainable Dolphin-watching Tourism in Fiordland, New Zealand". Tourism in Marine Environments. 3 (2): 173–178. doi:10.3727/154427306779435184.
- Rayment, W.; Dawson, S.; Slooten, L. (2009). "Use of T-PODs for acoustic monitoring of Cephalorhynchus dolphins: A case study with Hector's dolphins in a marine protected area". Endangered Species Research. 10: 333–339. doi:10.3354/esr00189.
- Rayment, William; Dawson, Steve; Slooten, Liz (2009). "Trialling an automated passive acoustic detector (T-POD) with Hector's dolphins (Cephalorhynchus hectori)". Journal of the Marine Biological Association of the United Kingdom. 89 (5): 1015–1022. Bibcode:2009JMBUK..89.1015R. doi:10.1017/S0025315409003129. S2CID 86074302.
- Shephard, Kerry; Harraway, John; Lovelock, Brent; Skeaff, Sheila; Slooten, Liz; Strack, Mick; Furnari, Mary; Jowett, Tim (2014). "Is the environmental literacy of university students measurable?". Environmental Education Research. 20 (4): 476–495. doi:10.1080/13504622.2013.816268. hdl:10523/7640. S2CID 54776882.
- Jowett, Tim; Harraway, John; Lovelock, Brent; Skeaff, Sheila; Slooten, Liz; Strack, Mick; Shephard, Kerry (2014). "Multinomial-Regression Modeling of the Environmental Attitudes of Higher Education Students Based on the Revised New Ecological Paradigm Scale". The Journal of Environmental Education. 45 (1): 1–15. Bibcode:2014JEnEd..45....1J. doi:10.1080/00958964.2013.783777. S2CID 143645420.
- Shephard, Kerry; Harraway, John; Jowett, Tim; Lovelock, Brent; Skeaff, Sheila; Slooten, Liz; Strack, Mick; Furnari, Mary (2015). "Longitudinal analysis of the environmental attitudes of university students". Environmental Education Research. 21 (6): 805–820. doi:10.1080/13504622.2014.913126. hdl:10523/7641. S2CID 146242061.
