= National Aquarium of New Zealand =

- National Aquarium of New Zealand's former logo

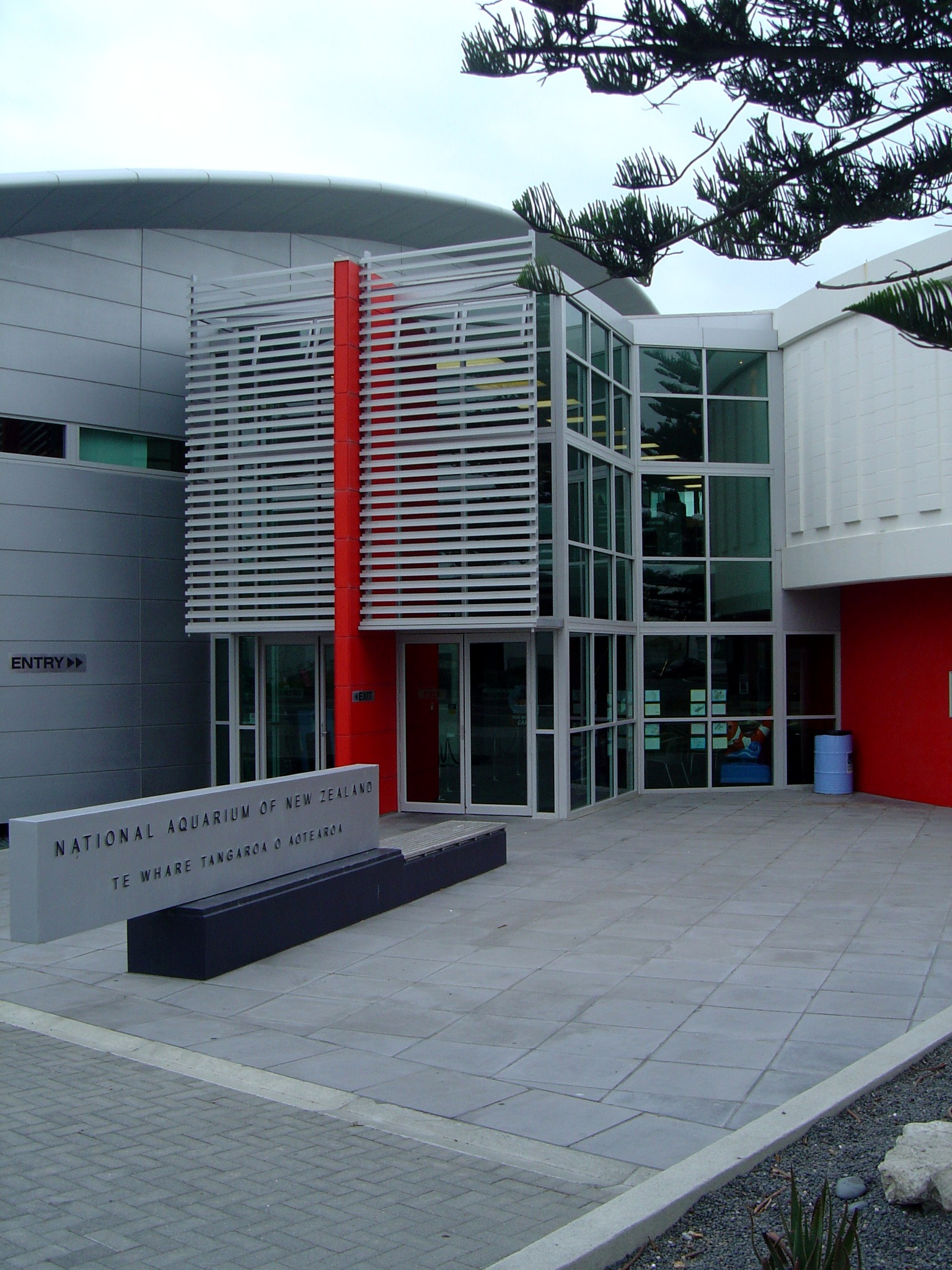
- Entrance to the aquarium
- Interactive map of National Aquarium of New Zealand
- 39°30′03″S 176°55′08″E
- Date opened: December 1976
- Location: Napier, New Zealand
- No. of animals: 1500+
- No. of species: 50+
- Volume of largest tank: 1.5×10^{6} L (330,000 imp gal; 400,000 U.S. gal)
- Major exhibits: Oceanarium, fish, reptiles, kiwi, penguins
- Owner: Napier City Council
- Website: Official website

The National Aquarium of New Zealand, formerly Napier Aquarium, is a public aquarium on Marine Parade in Napier, New Zealand. It was started in 1957 and moved to its present location in December 1976. It is owned by Napier City Council. In addition to many fish species, exhibits include kiwi, tuatara, turtles, little penguins and some lizards.

== History ==
In 1957, members of Napier's Thirty Thousand Club and the Hawke's Bay Aquarium and Water Garden Society decided to create a public aquarium with tropical fish and unusual specimens of local fish in the basement of the War Memorial Hall that was being built on Marine Parade.

The aquarium moved to its current location on Marine Parade in 1976. In the first year it attracted 230,000 visitors at a time when the population of Napier was about 50,000. In its first 5 years of operation over 750,000 people visited.

The aquarium acquired piranhas from Cleveland, Ohio, U.S., in 1979, trading seahorses for them. In 2019 the 21 elderly piranhas remaining were euthanased, as new government rules no longer allowed them to be kept in the aquarium's tanks.

In 2002 the aquarium underwent a NZ$8 million extension and renovation which included the addition of a 1.5 million litre oceanarium with a 50m acrylic tunnel and the replacement of all the original tanks with newly constructed ones. It was renamed the National Aquarium of New Zealand.

In 2010 the aquarium's crocodile named Izzy died after being at the aquarium for 20 years. In 2011 Butterfly Creek in Auckland loaned an American alligator named Cheryl to the zoo; the alligator was sent back to Butterfly Creek in 2020.

In 2016 an octopus named Inky escaped from his enclosure at the aquarium and was never found again. The escape received worldwide media attention.

Since 2017 aquarium staff have voted for the best behaved and naughtiest Penguin of the Month from the resident colony of little penguins, which has proved very popular on social media. There is also a public vote for Penguin of the Year which takes place annually in October.

After the deaths of three of the sharks due to the "impacts of Cyclone Gabrielle", as well as the injuries of the noses of other sharks, the aquarium released their two remaining sharks in 2023. The aquarium does not plan on getting any new sharks.

Due to increasing maintenance costs and government seeking to reduce taxpayer burden, the city of Napier offered the aquarium for sale in 2025.

== Facilities and exhibits ==
There are two temporary exhibit halls (one on the upper level and the other adjacent to the oceanarium), a souvenir shop and cafe.

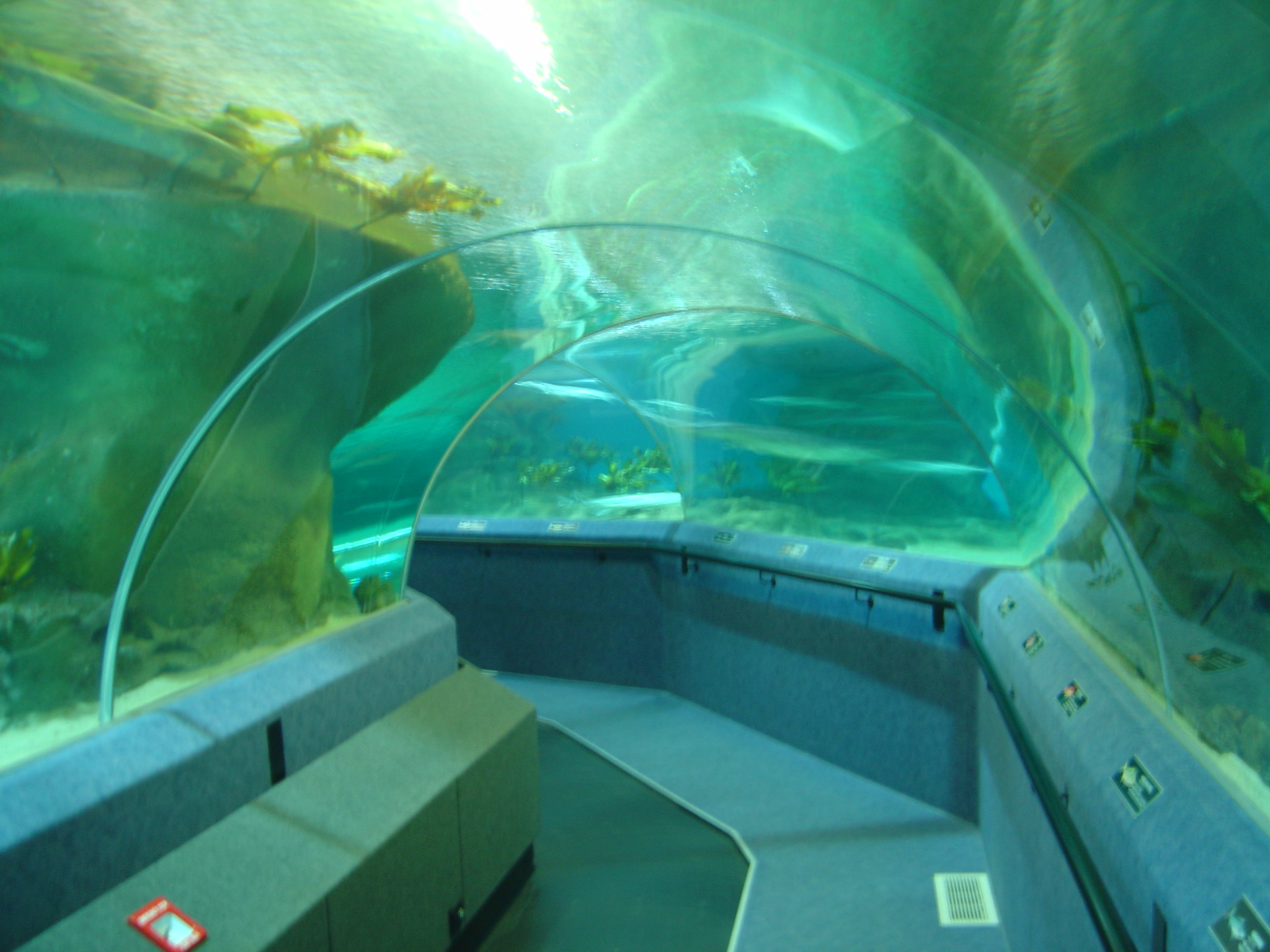
Inside the 50m acrylic tunnel of the 1.5 million litre oceanarium

Exhibits include:

- African Cichlids
- Amazon Pacu
- Asian Tropical
- Asian Water Garden
- Dinosaur & NZ fossils
- Australian water dragon

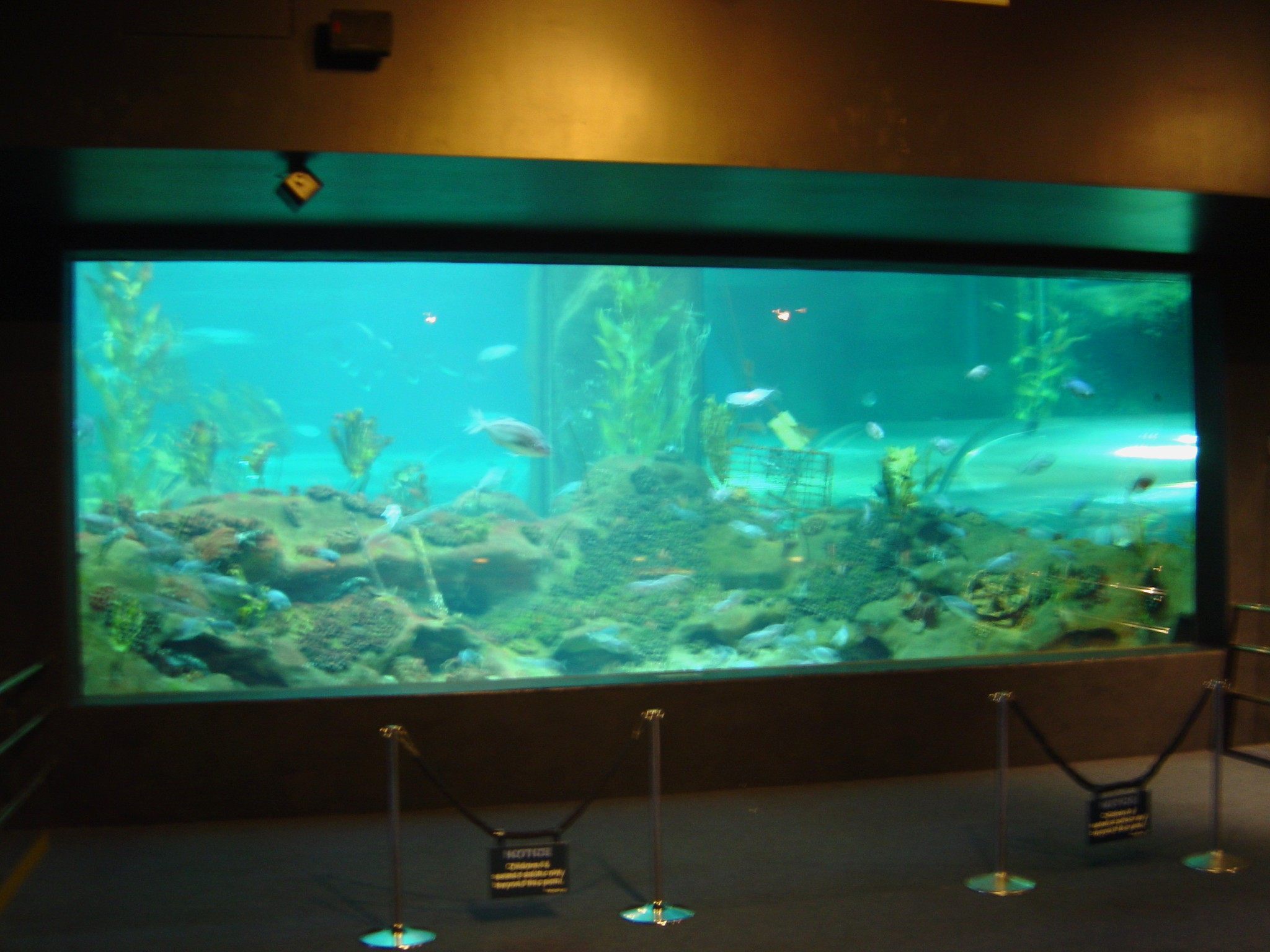
Viewing window into the oceanarium

- Waterfall
- Coral Reef
- Tuatara
- New Zealand Stream
- Kiwi Enclosure
- New Zealand Fresh Water
- Little Penguins
- Eels
- Hawksbill Sea Turtle
- Rocky Shore
- Seahorse
- Oceanarium

== See also ==
- Marineland of New Zealand
