= Bev Lawton =

New Zealand professor of women's health

Bev Lawton CNZM
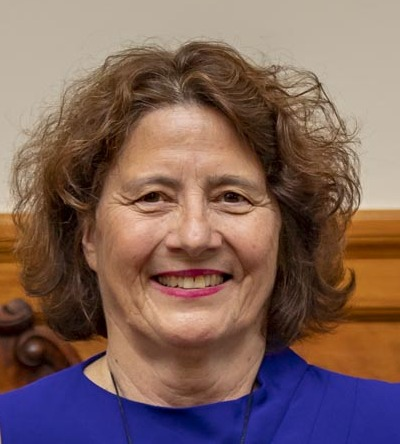
- Lawton in 2023
- Born: Beverley-Anne Singe
- Relatives: Arthur Singe (great-uncle)
- Awards: Innovation, science and health category, Women of Influence Awards (2021); Beaven Medal (2023); Te Tohu Rapuora Medal (2023)

Academic background
- Education: Victoria University of Wellington (BSc); University of Otago (MB ChB)

Academic work
- Discipline: Women's health
- Institutions: University of Otago, Wellington; Victoria University of Wellington

Beverley-Anne Lawton CNZM (née Singe) is a New Zealand academic and full professor at Victoria University of Wellington, specialising in women's health, particularly maternal health and cervical cancer prevention.

== Early life and education ==
Lawton is Māori, of Ngāti Porou descent, and grew up in a bicultural family in Wellington. She initially wanted to join the police but did not meet the height requirements, and instead trained as a GP. She graduated with a Bachelor of Science degree from Victoria University of Wellington in 1978 and subsequently studied medicine at the University of Otago, graduating MB ChB in 1983.

== Career ==
Lawton worked as a general practitioner in Newtown for seventeen years, where, prompted by a lack of support for menopausal women, she co-founded the Wellington Women's Menopause Clinic. She published a guide to the menopause in 2013. Lawton has also worked to improve coordination of maternal healthcare and wraparound services, addressing issues such as transport, immunisation, power and oral health. Lawton noticed significant differences in care during her time as a GP, saying in a 2022 interview:

"Women get treated differently than men. The man steps up and he's going to have the cardiac investigation if he's white and middle class. Not only do women get treated differently, Māori get treated differently, so if you're a Māori woman your life expectancy, your recovery from a heart attack, is the worst. You're more likely to die ... I always think it's a double-double. Not only are you Māori, you're female and that's like two strikes."

Lawton joined the faculty of the University of Otago, Wellington, and then later transferred to Victoria University of Wellington, rising to full professor. Lawton is the founder and director of Te Tātai Hauora o Hine, the National Centre for Women's Health Research Aotearoa at Victoria University, the aim of which is to do research into preventable death and harm to women. Describing the centre's work, Lawton says "you shouldn't have to suffer cervical cancer ... This is the right of every woman to be well. We need to put it in strength-based language". Lawton's work led to district health boards (now Te Whatu Ora) collecting statistics on maternal mortality, through the Severe Maternal Mortality monitoring programme.

Lawton is an advocate for self-screening for HPV for cervical cancer prevention. Cervical cancer is the second leading cause of death in Māori women, and yet research had shown that Māori and Pasifika women were less likely to have smear tests. This means self-testing for HPV is an accessibility and equity issue, with Lawton's research showing that under-screened or never-screened Māori women were more than three times as likely to self-test than get a Pap test.

When New Zealand's first Women's Health Strategy was released in 2023, Lawton was critical that it missed the opportunity to take some easy actions, like making contraception and cervical screening free. She commented that "this strategy seems more like guidelines, and we need to know that this is not going to just sit in the cupboard".

== Honours and awards ==
Lawton was appointed an Officer of the New Zealand Order of Merit in the 2004 New Year Honours, for services to women's health. In 2017, she was made a Distinguished Fellow of the Royal New Zealand College of General Practitioners.

In 2020, Lawton was awarded the Royal Australia and New Zealand College of Obstetricians and Gynaecologists Māori Women's Health Award. In 2021, she won the Innovation, Science and Health category of the Women of Influence awards. The award recognised her contribution to women's health, noting that she had been congratulated in parliament by Ayesha Verrall for her and her team's input into the process to get Government support for self-testing for cervical cancer screening.

In 2023, Lawton was awarded the Royal Society Te Apārangi's Beaven Medal, which is awarded for excellence in translational health research. She also co-leads the team that won the 2023 HRC's Te Tohu Rapuora Medal for outstanding leadership, excellence and contribution to Māori health. Lawton was named the 2025 Kiwibank New Zealander of the Year Te Pou Whakarae o Aotearoa.

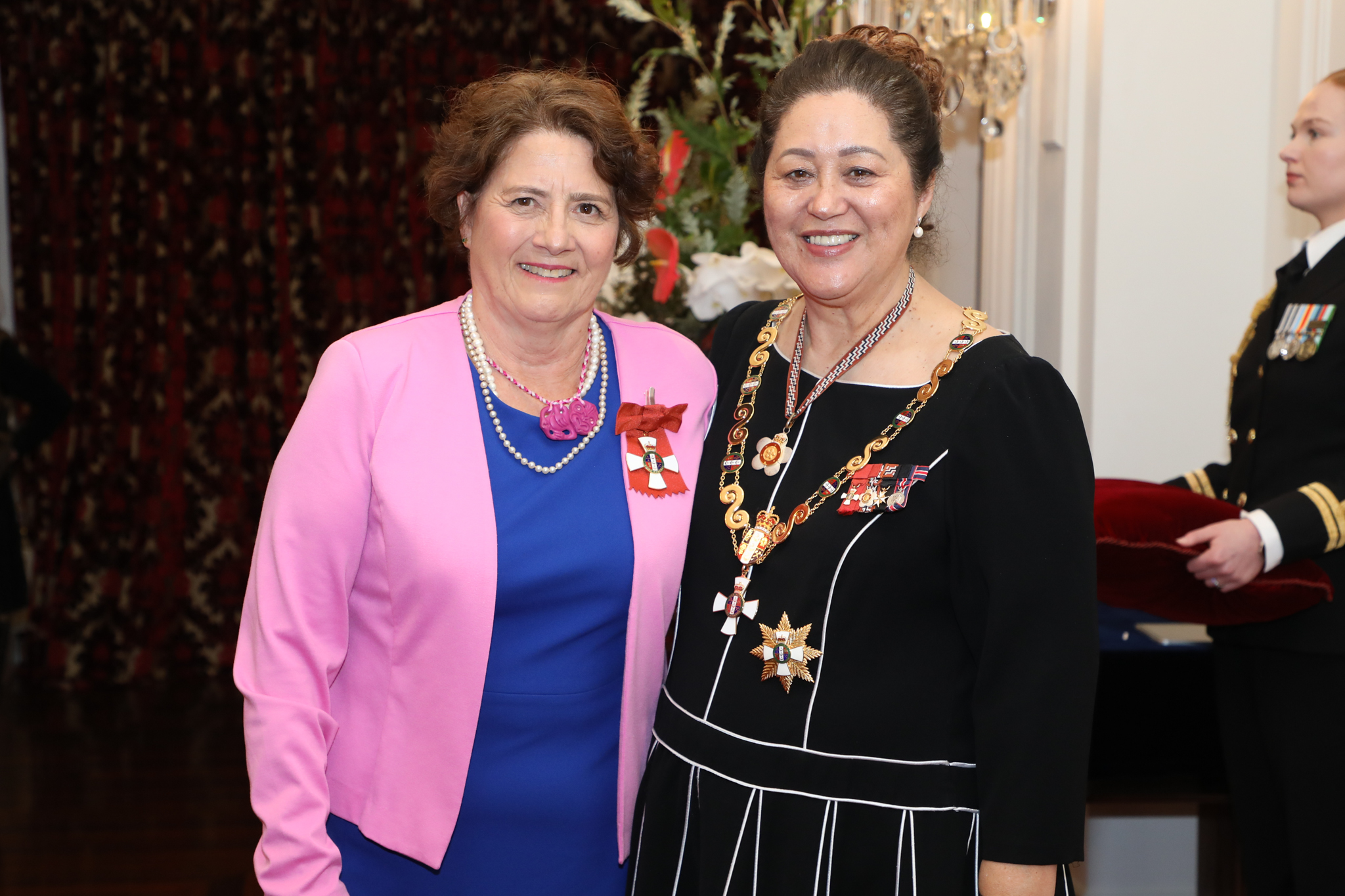
Lawton (left), after her investiture as a Companion of the New Zealand Order of Merit by the governor-general, Dame Cindy Kiro, at Government House, Wellington, on 20 May 2026

In the 2026 New Year Honours, Lawton was promoted to Companion of the New Zealand Order of Merit, for services to women's health.

== Selected works ==
- Madge R Vickers; Alastair H MacLennan; Beverley Lawton; et al. (11 July 2007). "Main morbidities recorded in the women's international study of long duration oestrogen after menopause (WISDOM): a randomised controlled trial of hormone replacement therapy in postmenopausal women". The BMJ. 335 (7613): 239. doi:10.1136/BMJ.39266.425069.AD. ISSN 0959-8138. PMC 1939792. PMID 17626056.
- Beverley A Lawton; Sally B Rose; C Raina Elley; Anthony C Dowell; Anna Fenton; Simon A Moyes (11 December 2008). "Exercise on prescription for women aged 40-74 recruited through primary care: two year randomised controlled trial". The BMJ. 337 a2509. doi:10.1136/BMJ.A2509. ISSN 0959-8138. PMC 2769033. PMID 19074218.
- Sue Garrett; C Raina Elley; Sally B Rose; Des O'Dea; Beverley A Lawton; Anthony C Dowell (1 March 2011). "Are physical activity interventions in primary care and the community cost-effective? A systematic review of the evidence". British Journal of General Practice. 61 (584): e125–e133. doi:10.3399/BJGP11X561249. ISSN 0960-1643. PMC 3047345. PMID 21375895.
- Amanda J Welton; Madge R Vickers; Joseph Kim; et al. (21 August 2008). "Health related quality of life after combined hormone replacement therapy: randomised controlled trial". The BMJ. 337 a1190. doi:10.1136/BMJ.A1190. ISSN 0959-8138. PMC 2518695. PMID 18719013.
- Beverley Lawton; Sally Rose; Deborah McLeod; Anthony Dowell (1 October 2003). "Changes in use of hormone replacement therapy after the report from the Women's Health Initiative: cross sectional survey of users" (PDF). The BMJ. 327 (7419): 845–846. doi:10.1136/BMJ.327.7419.845. ISSN 0959-8138. PMC 214025. PMID 14551101.
- C Raina Elley; M Clare Robertson; Sue Garrett; et al. (1 August 2008). "Effectiveness of a falls-and-fracture nurse coordinator to reduce falls: a randomized, controlled trial of at-risk older adults". Journal of the American Geriatrics Society. 56 (8): 1383–1389. doi:10.1111/J.1532-5415.2008.01802.X. ISSN 0002-8614. PMID 18808597.
