= Mike Joy (freshwater ecologist) =

New Zealand ecologist

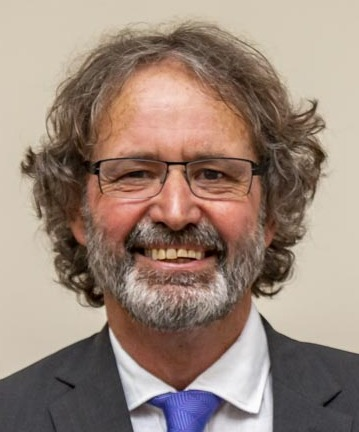
- Born: Michael Kevin Joy; 12 September 1959 (age 67); New Zealand
- Education: Massey University
- Awards: Charles Fleming Award for Environmental Achievement (2013); Forest & Bird's Old Blue Award (2011)
- Scientific career
- Fields: Freshwater ecology; Spatial ecology; Predictive ecology; Applied ecology
- Thesis: The development of predictive models to enhance biological assessment of riverine systems in New Zealand (2003)
- Doctoral advisor: Russell Death; Robert McDowall; Brian Springett

Michael Kevin Joy (born 12 September 1959) is a New Zealand freshwater ecologist and science communicator. He is currently employed at the Institute for Governance and Policy Studies at Victoria University of Wellington.

Joy is publicly outspoken about the decline in freshwater quality and ecosystems, especially the impact of nutrient pollution from intensive dairying on New Zealand's "100% Pure", clean, green image. This has led to awards from scientific organisations, as well as criticism from the dairy industry and former prime minister John Key.

== Career ==
Joy left school at 17. He worked various jobs including dairying, labouring, truck and taxi driving, building and sheep farming, before enrolling at Massey University in 1993 at the age of 33.

Joy's Master's thesis, entitled Freshwater fish community structure in Taranaki: dams, diadromy or habitat quality?, was completed in 1999 and received first-class honours. This led to his PhD thesis, The development of predictive models to enhance biological assessment of riverine systems in New Zealand, submitted in 2003 and supervised by freshwater ecologist Russell Death, Robert McDowall and Brian Springett.

Joy was a senior lecturer in ecology and environmental science at Massey University in Palmerston North until May 2018. From 2018 to May 2023, when the university disestablished his position, he was employed at the Institute for Governance and Policy Studies at Victoria University of Wellington. In June 2023, it was announced he would take up a five-year fellowship as the Morgan Foundation senior research fellow in freshwater ecology at Victoria, funded by the Morgan Foundation.

Joy regularly gives talks around the country to environmental, farming, community and school groups.

== Criticism of New Zealand's '100% Pure' branding ==
On 16 November 2012, on the eve of the release of the movie The Hobbit, The New York Times published an article contrasting the image of New Zealand portrayed by Tourism New Zealand with the less appealing views put forward by others, including the Ministry for the Environment, the Green Party, and Federated Farmers. Joy was quoted as saying, "There are almost two worlds in New Zealand. There is the picture-postcard world, and then there is the reality," and that for a country purporting to be so pure, New Zealand seemed to be failing many international environmental standards.

Following this, Joy was accused of economic sabotage, treachery, ego-tripping and overstatement. Mark Unsworth, from government relations consultancy Saunders Unsworth, accused Joy in a leaked email of selfish egotism, and stated that "You guys are the foot and mouth disease of the tourism industry. Most ordinary people in NZ would happily have you lot locked up." Controversial political blogger Cameron Slater initially wrote in support of The New York Times article, stating that it was a "serious problem" that over half of New Zealand's rivers were unsafe for swimming, and that dairy farmers should not be subsidised for polluting. However, Slater later came out in support of Unsworth's leaked email. Slater is also widely quoted as saying that "Joy should be taken out and shot at dawn for economic sabotage" and calling him a traitor, but these words appear to be commentary from other authors published on his blog. Prime Minister John Key dismissed the criticism of the 100% Pure New Zealand brand, saying that the slogan was not inaccurate but needed "to be taken with a pinch of salt".

Joy's statements were supported by the New Zealand Association of Scientists. In a press statement, the Association focused on claims in a New Zealand Herald editorial that damage currently being done to New Zealand's environment was insignificant and that criticism of Joy was "well-warranted" [contradicting statements]. The Association particularly opposed the implication that the damage caused by Joy to New Zealand's international reputation and potential loss of tourists was of greater importance than "the need for truth in public debate".

In 2016, Joy was quoted as saying that he was hurt by the incident but undeterred, and that "for every one Unsworth, there are 20 people who randomly email me or ring me and thank me for what I'm doing".

== Awards ==
In 2009, Joy received the Ecology in Action award from the New Zealand Ecological Society. In 2011, he was awarded Forest & Bird's Old Blue award for his research into freshwater ecology and his work bringing freshwater conservation issues to public attention.

Joy received the Royal Society of New Zealand's Charles Fleming Award for Environmental Achievement in 2013, for his contribution to the sustainable management and protection of New Zealand's freshwater ecosystems. Recipients of the award are required to deliver a public lecture series over the next year, hosted by selected branches of the Royal Society. Joy's 2014 tour was entitled The demise of New Zealand’s fresh waters: politics and science, where he discussed the sidelining of freshwater science by politics, the lack of acknowledgement of the loss of natural capital, and the importance of scientists speaking up for the science.
