= Merilyn Hibma =

New Zealand viral immunologist

Academic background
- Theses: Humoral immunity in pregnancy : a guinea pig model (1986); Humoral immunity in farmed deer (1989)

Academic work
- Institutions: University of Otago

Merilyn Hibma is a New Zealand viral immunologist, and is a full professor at the University of Otago, specialising in immune regulation by viruses, especially human papillomavirus, the causative agent of cervical cancer.

== Academic career ==
Hibma completed Master of Science in microbiology at Otago, followed by a PhD titled Humoral immunity in farmed deer also at Otago in 1989. Hibma completed her postdoctoral research at the University of Cambridge, working with Lionel Crawford at the Imperial Cancer Research Fund laboratory. Hibma was awarded a Health Research Council Repatriation Fellowship, which allowed her to return to take up a faculty position in the Department of Microbiology and Immunology at the University of Otago. Hibma transferred to the Department of Pathology in 2014, the same year she was appointed research associate professor. She was promoted to full professor in 2021. Hibma is an associate researcher in the Maurice Wilkins Centre for Molecular Biodiscovery.

Hibma's research focuses on immune regulation by viruses, and she has a particular interest in human papillomavirus, the causative agent of cervical cancer. Hibma's team identified a viral protein, named E7, that appeared to be responsible for suppressing the immune response to the virus. The presence of this protein in patients was correlated with the later development of cervical cancer. Hibma works on understanding the biology of human papillomavirus, as well as the development of new immunotherapeutics.

Hibma has led efforts to get effective screening and treatment programmes for cervical cancer in the Pacific.

== Selected works ==
- Kate Middleton; Woei Peh; Southern, Shirley; et al. (2003). "Organization of human papillomavirus productive cycle during neoplastic progression provides a basis for selection of diagnostic markers". Journal of Virology. 77 (19): 10186–10201. doi:10.1128/jvi.77.19.10186-10201.2003. PMC 228472. PMID 12970404. Wikidata Q36524778.
- Kate Matthews; Cheng Mee Leong; Lindsay Baxter; Emma Inglis; Kankatsu Yun; B Thomas Bäckström; John Doorbar; Hibma, Merilyn (2003). "Depletion of Langerhans cells in human papillomavirus type 16-infected skin is associated with E6-mediated down regulation of E-cadherin". Journal of Virology. 77 (15): 8378–8385. doi:10.1128/jvi.77.15.8378-8385.2003. PMC 165258. PMID 12857907. Wikidata Q35155315.
- Edwards, Sara; Brett R Dix; Colleen J Myers; Deirdre Dobson-Le; Lily Huschtscha; Hibma, Merilyn; Janice Royds; Antony W Braithwaite (2002). "Evidence that replication of the antitumor adenovirus ONYX-015 is not controlled by the p53 and p14(ARF) tumor suppressor genes". Journal of Virology. 76 (24): 12483–12490. doi:10.1128/jvi.76.24.12483-12490.2002. PMC 136704. PMID 12438574. Wikidata Q39685569.
- J Dillner; F Wiklund; Lenner, Per; C Eklund; V Frederiksson-Shanazarian; J T Schiller; Hibma, Merilyn; Hallmans, Göran; U Stendahl (1995). "Antibodies against linear and conformational epitopes of human papillomavirus type 16 that independently associate with incident cervical cancer". International Journal of Cancer. 60 (3): 377–382. doi:10.1002/ijc.2910600318. PMID 7530234. Wikidata Q71669731.
- Royds JA; Hibma, Merilyn; Dix BR; Hananeia L; Russell IA; Wiles A; Wynford-Thomas D; Braithwaite AW (2006). "p53 promotes adenoviral replication and increases late viral gene expression". Oncogene. 25 (10): 1509–1520. doi:10.1038/sj.onc.1209185. PMID 16247442. Wikidata Q40358341.
- Stephanie Dillon; Toshiyuki Sasagawa; Anna Crawford; Jan Prestidge; Marie K Inder; Jim Jerram; Mercer, Andrew Allan; Hibma, Merilyn (2007). "Resolution of cervical dysplasia is associated with T-cell proliferative responses to human papillomavirus type 16 E2". Journal of General Virology. 88 (Pt 3): 803–813. doi:10.1099/vir.0.82678-0. PMID 17325352. Wikidata Q45128963.
