= Sea level rise in New Zealand =

Effect of climate change in New Zealand

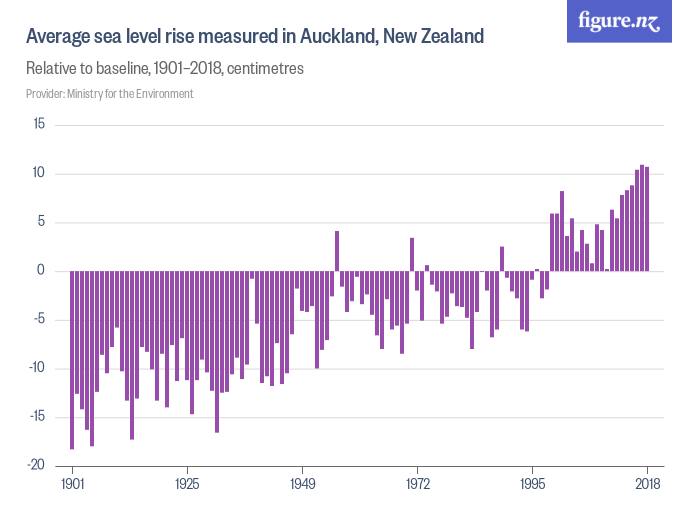
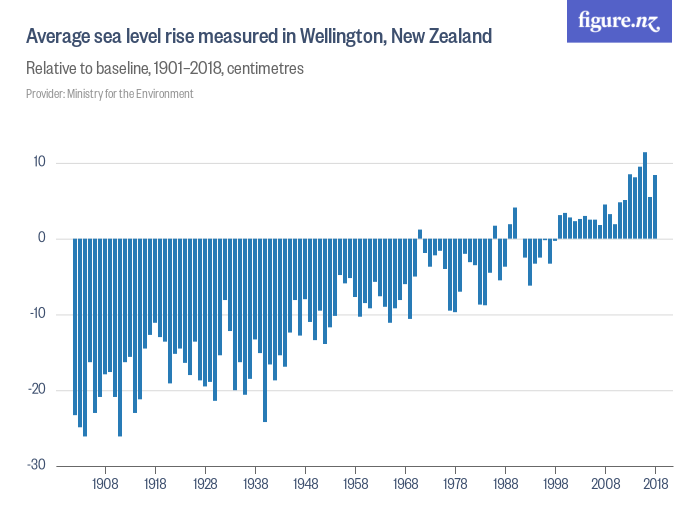
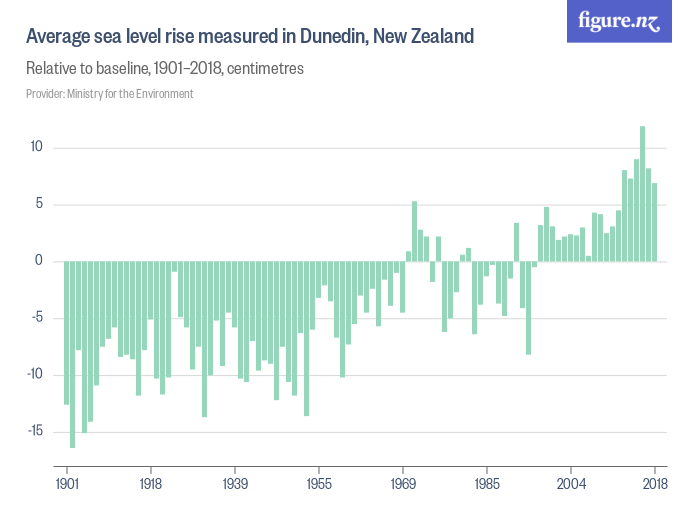
Average sea level rise in centimetres measured in Auckland (top), Wellington (middle), and Dunedin (bottom) relative to baseline, 1901–2018

Sea level rise in New Zealand refers to the increase in average sea level around the country’s coasts as a result of global climate change. Tide‑gauge and satellite records show that sea levels around New Zealand have risen at rates similar to the global average, though local trends vary because of vertical land movement from tectonic processes and subsidence. National projections indicate that sea levels will continue to rise throughout the 21st century under all emissions scenarios, with some regions expected to experience substantially higher relative sea‑level rise where land is sinking.

Sea‑level rise contributes to more frequent coastal flooding, shoreline erosion, saltwater intrusion, and impacts on infrastructure, housing, and low‑lying ecosystems. These effects are expected to get worse as sea levels rise, particularly in major urban areas and subsiding coastal plains. Local authorities and central government agencies have developed adaptation frameworks, hazard assessments, and long‑term planning tools to manage these risks, including managed retreat in some locations.

== Overview ==
Sea level rise in New Zealand poses a significant threat to many communities, including New Zealand's larger population centres, and has major implications for infrastructure in coastal areas. In 2016, the Royal Society of New Zealand stated that a one-metre rise would cause coastal erosion and flooding, especially when combined with storm surges. Climate scientist Jim Salinger commented that New Zealand will have to abandon some coastal areas when the weather gets uncontrollable. Twelve of the fifteen largest towns and cities in New Zealand are coastal with 65% of communities and major infrastructure lying within five kilometres of the sea. The value of local government infrastructure that is vulnerable to sea level rise has been estimated at $5 billion. As flooding becomes more frequent, coastal homeowners will experience significant losses and displacement. Some may be forced to abandon their properties after a single, sudden disaster like a storm surge or flash flood or move away after a series of smaller flooding events that eventually become intolerable. Local and central government will face high costs from adaptive measures and continued provision of infrastructure when abandoning housing may be more efficient.

The results of studies from a programme called NZ Searise released in 2022, indicate that for some parts of New Zealand, the apparent sea level rise will be twice as fast as previously predicted. This is because of the combined effect of absolute rise in sea level with gradual subsidence of ground levels. In some parts of Wellington, the land is subsiding by 3–4 mm per year, leading to an apparent 30 cm of sea-level rise in 18 years. By 2040, this is forecast to cause inundations every year that are equivalent to a 1-in-100 year event in 2020.

== Records and measurements prior to 2000 ==
An analysis in 2004 of long term records from four New Zealand tide gauges indicated an average rate of increase in sea level of 1.6 mm a year for the 100 years to 2000, which was considered to be relatively consistent with other regional and global sea level rise calculations when corrected for glacial-isostatic effects. One global average rate of sea-level rise is 1.7 ± 0.3 mm per year for the 20th century (Church and White (2006). Another global average rate of sea-level rise is 1.8 mm/yr ± 0.1 for the period 1880–1980.

A 2008 study of cores from salt-marshes near Pounawea indicated that the rate of sea level rise in the 20th century, 2.8 ± 0.5 mm per year, had been greater than rate of change in earlier centuries (0.3 ± 0.3 mm per year from AD 1500 to AD 1900) and that the 20th century sea level rise was consistent with instrumental measurements recorded since 1924.

== Records and measurements up to 2020 ==
Predictions about sea level rise vary considerably. In November 2014, Dr Jan Wright, the Parliamentary Commissioner for the Environment released a report titled Changing climate and rising seas: Understanding the science which says that the sea level is ‘locked in’ to rise by about 30 centimetres by 2050. However, a 2016 report published by the Royal Society of New Zealand finds it likely that the sea level around New Zealand will rise by more than a metre by the end of the century and will exceed the global average by 5–10%. Projections of future sea level rise depend on which carbon emission scenario model is used. Research in 2019 based on a two degree increase in temperature, which is scenario consistent with the Paris Agreement, leads to a possible 81 cm rise by 2100. An Australian policy paper published by Breakthrough in May 2019 predicts a three degree rise in temperature leading to a sea level rise as high as three metres.

In 2016, the Royal Society of New Zealand stated that a one-metre rise would cause coastal erosion and flooding, especially when combined with storm surges. Climate scientist Jim Salinger commented that New Zealand will have to abandon some coastal areas when the weather gets uncontrollable.

Associate Professor Nancy Bertler, of the Joint Antarctic Research Institute, at Victoria University of Wellington says: "New research suggests that sea level could rise as quickly as four metres per 100 years (or one metre per 25 years). Assuming even a modest global sea level increase of 50 cm by 2100 (IPCC scenario RCP 4.5), the frequency of coastal inundation in New Zealand is predicted to increase by a multiplier of 1000 times."

Rising sea levels will further threaten coastal areas and erode and alter landscapes whilst also resulting in salt water intrusion into soils, reducing soil quality and limiting plant species growth. The Ministry for the Environment says by 2050–2070, storms and high tides which produce extreme coastal water levels will occur on average at least once a year instead of once every 100 years. GNS climate scientist Tim Naish, says in the event of a two-metre rise in sea-level by the end of the century, one-in-100-year flooding event will become a daily event. Naish says: “We are a coastal nation so we are going to get whacked by sea-level rise. In many areas, we have to retreat "which comes with massive disruption and social and economic issues.”

Twelve of the fifteen largest towns and cities in New Zealand are coastal with 65% of communities and major infrastructure lying within five kilometres of the sea. The value of local government infrastructure that is vulnerable to sea level rise has been estimated at $5 billion. As flooding becomes more frequent, coastal homeowners will experience significant losses and displacement. Some may be forced to abandon their properties after a single, sudden disaster like a storm surge or flash flood or move away after a series of smaller flooding events that eventually become intolerable. Local and central government will face high costs from adaptive measures and continued provision of infrastructure when abandoning housing may be more efficient.

In Auckland, the CBD, eastern bays, Onehunga, Māngere Bridge, Devonport and Helensville are the most vulnerable to inundation.

Wellington is anticipating a 1.5 metre rise which could see much of the central city and low-lying suburbs under water. Areas likely to be inundated include the area around Westpac stadium, swathes of land through the central city, as well as lower parts of Oriental Bay, Evans Bay, Kilbirnie, Shelly Bay, Seatoun, the South Coast bays, parts of Petone, Waiwhetu and the eastern bays as well as much of low-lying areas at Mākara Beach, Pāuatahanui, and Kāpiti.

=== NZ Searise study findings 2022 ===
The results of studies from a programme called NZ Searise released in 2022, indicate that for some parts of New Zealand, the apparent sea level rise will be twice as fast as previously predicted. This is because of the combined effect of absolute rise in sea level with gradual subsidence of ground levels. In some parts of Wellington, the land is subsiding by 3-4 mm per year, leading to an apparent 30 cm of sea-level rise in 18 years. By 2040, this is forecast to cause inundations every year that are equivalent to a 1-in-100 year event in 2020.

These revised projections cut in half the time that was thought to be available to plan and implement risk management strategies for these vulnerable areas. The current forecast for global sea level rise is for 0.5 m by 2100, but in some parts of New Zealand, the effective rise in sea level could be twice as great by that time, because of the combined effect of gradual land subsidence. Many different parts of the country are affected by the change in forecast sea level rise. For example, because of the effects of gradual land subsidence, Akaroa on Banks Peninsula in Canterbury can expect 30 cm of sea level rise by the year 2040, instead of 2060. The Wairarapa coastline, around the south-east of the North Island, is forecast to experience the largest increases in sea level.

=== Satellite data 2025 ===
Alongside the direct impacts of sea level rise, human activity such as groundwater withdrawal and land reclamation contribute to the subsidence of coastlines, amplifying the effects of sea level rise for certain densely populated coastal urban areas. Measurements taken using InSAR utilised satellite radar images of the Earth’s surface to measure vertical land movement across New Zealand’s coastline, building on the NZSearise project. This analysis found that 77% of urban coastlines are subsiding at rates of −0.5 mm or more each year, and 10% are subsiding faster than −3.0 mm per year. Some of the fastest rates were identified in coastal suburbs of Christchurch, where the land is still adjusting to the impact of the 2011 earthquake.

Vertical land movement in major cities.
Urban centre	Subsidence (mm/year)
Auckland	1.5
Wellington	2.4
Christchurch	3.6
Dunedin	1.6

=== NZ government reporting ===
Every three years, the NZ government's Ministry for the Environment and Stats NZ release a series of 'Our environment' reports. Their report, 'Our marine environment 2025' stated that New Zealand's oceans were warming 34% faster than the global average, accelerating sea level rise. The report noted that 219,000 homes, worth $180bn were located in coastal inundation and inland flood zones, along with $26bn worth of infrastructure at risk.

== Vulnerable areas ==
=== South Dunedin ===
Due to being built largely on reclaimed land, South Dunedin is particularly at risk from sea level rise. Much of South Dunedin was built at a time when groundwater was up to 17cm lower than it is now. As sea level rises, so too will groundwater levels, increasing the risk of surface flooding, damage to infrastructure, and liquefaction during earthquakes. Currently, more than half of buildings in South Dunedin are at risk of surface flooding, and this is expected to increase to almost 70 percent by the year 2100. A 2016 report by Parliamentary Commissioner for the Environment Jan Wright identified South Dunedin as the single biggest community in New Zealand exposed to sea level rise, with 2700 houses identified as within 25cm of the mean high tide mark, some of which are already below sea level.

=== Nelson airport ===
The NZ SeaRise programme identified Nelson airport as one area of particular vulnerability, with a projected subsidence of 5 millimetres (0.20 in) per year. In February 2018, the approach road to the airport was flooded when the adjoining Jenkins Creek burst its banks during a storm that brought king tides and strong winds. The airport was closed for about one hour. The airport's Chief Executive said that the proposed runway extension would be planned around the latest sea level rise forecast, and that the airport was "here to stay", despite the concerns over the threats posed by sea level rise.

== Adaptation plan ==
In August 2022, the Ministry for the Environment published Aotearoa New Zealand's first National Adaptation Plan, covering the years 2022–2028. The plan includes a range of adaptation options: Avoid, Protect, Accommodate and Retreat.

== See also ==
- Climate change in New Zealand – Emissions, impacts and responses of New Zealand related to climate change
