= Augie Auer =

August Henry Auer Jr
- Born: 10 June 1940; St. Louis, Missouri, U.S.
- Died: 10 June 2007 (aged 67); Melbourne, Australia
- Other name: "Augie"
- Education: Colorado State University
- Known for: meteorologist
- Scientific career
- Workplaces: University of Wyoming, Meteorological Service of New Zealand Limited

August Henry "Augie" Auer Jr (10 June 1940 – 10 June 2007) was an American-born atmospheric scientist and meteorologist in New Zealand.

== Life ==
As a boy growing up in St. Louis, Missouri, Auer was reportedly fascinated by weather. After a freak winter storm caused havoc in his home town, he decided to become a meteorologist. He studied meteorology at Colorado State University before getting a job at the University of Wyoming.

Auer was a Professor of Atmospheric Science at the University of Wyoming for 22 years. A land use typing method to classify land as urban or rural, based on work he published in 1978, is used by the United States Environmental Protection Agency and by the Jamaican National Environment and Planning Agency. His most frequently cited research paper involves ice crystals in clouds.

In 1990, Auer emigrated to New Zealand, becoming Chief Meteorologist for the Meteorological Service of New Zealand Limited from 1990 to 1998. He also presented the weather forecast on TV3 News for several years, often preferring to use colloquialisms instead of technical jargon. Auer was frequently quoted in the New Zealand press regarding weather and climate issues, and was regarded in New Zealand as a "well-known and colourful meteorologist".

In 2006, he helped found the New Zealand Climate Science Coalition to argue against claims for man-made global warming, leading the MetService to publicly disavow the views of their former Chief Meteorologist. Following the transfer of "climate science" issues from the then New Zealand Meteorological Service into the National Institute of Water and Atmospheric Research (NIWA) in 1992, Augie become critical of its statements, including those of former associate Jim Salinger.

In a 19 May 2007 interview with The Timaru Herald newspaper, Auer claimed that a combination of misinterpreted and misguided science, media hype, and political spin had created the current hysteria and it was time to put a stop to it, adding "It is time to attack the myth of global warming."

On 10 June 2007, Auer died suddenly of a heart attack while dining with family in Melbourne, while celebrating his 35th wedding anniversary and his 67th birthday.

== See also ==
- Climate change in New Zealand
