= List of honorary doctors of Lincoln University (New Zealand) =

The list of Honorary Doctors of Lincoln University below shows the recipients of honorary doctorates conferred by Lincoln University in New Zealand since it attained full autonomy from the University of Canterbury in 1990.

Year	Recipient	Degree
1993	Helen Hughes	DSc
1993	Sidney Hurst	DSc
1994	Robert Sutherland	DSc
1996	Wahawaha Stirling	DNatRes
1997	Allan Wright	DCom
1997	Alfred Jabu Numpang	DNatRes
1998	Vicki Buck	DCom
1998	Diana, Lady Isaac	DNatRes
1998	Alberto Fujimori	DSc (revoked in 2010)
1999	Ron Trotter	DCom
1999	Don McKinnon	DCom
2000	Malcolm Cameron	DSc
2000	Tim Wallis	DCom
2000	Mike Moore	DCom
2001	Terry Ryan	DSc
2001	John Buck	DCom
2001	Hamid Bin Bugo	DCom
2002	Peter Elworthy	DCom
2002	Charlie Challenger	DNatRes
2003	Gerry McSweeney	DNatRes
2003	Suranant Subhadrabandhu	DSc
2004	Tipene O'Regan	DCom
2004	Morgan Williams	DNatRes
2005	Frank Boffa	DNatRes
2005	Reinhart Langer	DSc
2006	Margaret Austin	DSc
2006	Allan Hubbard	DCom
2007	Bob Charles	DNatRes
2007	Peri Drysdale	DCom
2008	Chris Doig	DSocSc
2008	Graham Kitson	DSc
2009	Mark Inglis	DNatRes
2009	John Roadley	DCom
2010	Garth Carnaby	DSc
2010	Rob Fenwick	DNatRes
2011	Henry van der Heyden	DCom
2012	Graeme Harrison	DCom
2012	Richie McCaw	DNatRes
2012	Jan Wright	DSc
2013	John Palmer	DCom
2014	Peter Townsend	DCom
2015	Mark Solomon	DNatRes
2015	Sue Suckling	DSc
2016	John Luxton	DSc
2016	Peter Skelton	DNatRes
2017	Annabel Langbein	DCom
2018	Margaret Bazley	DNatRes
2018	Tom Lambie	DNatRes
2018	Geoff Ross	DCom
2019	John Penno	DCom
2019	Hugh Wilson	DNatRes
2019	John Tavendale	DCom
2020	Jim Douglas	DSc
2020	Tony Hall	DCom
2021	Andy Borland	DCom
2022	David Carter	DCom
2022	Bruce Scoggins	DSc
2022	Phil Beatson	DSc
2023	David Shearer	DCom
2023	Anake Goodall	DNatRes
2024	Steve Smith	DCom
2024	Deb Gilbertson	DSc
2025	Andy Macfarlane	DCom
