= Vincent Gray =

Vincent Gray may refer to:

- Vincent C. Gray (born 1942), American politician and former mayor of Washington, D.C.
- Vincent R. Gray (1922–2018), New Zealand chemist and global warming denier
- Vincent Gray (American football) (born 1999), American football player

== See also ==
- Vincent Grey
