= Livestock Emissions and Abatement Research Network =

The Livestock Emissions and Abatement Research Network is an international research network focused on improving the understanding of greenhouse gas emissions from livestock agriculture.

It was established in November 2007.

== See also ==
- Climate change in New Zealand
- Environment of New Zealand
