= Vincent R. Gray =

New Zealand chemist (1922–2018)

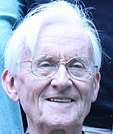
Vincent Gray

Vincent Richard Gray (24 March 1922 – 14 June 2018) was a New Zealand chemist, and a founder of the climate change denial organization New Zealand Climate Science Coalition.

== Career ==
Born in London on 24 March 1922, Gray was awarded a PhD in physical chemistry by the University of Cambridge after studies on incendiary bomb fluids made from aluminium soaps. He moved to New Zealand in 1970 to become the first Director of the Building Research Association (BRANZ) and later, Chief Chemist of the Coal Research Association. He also published many articles and reports, seven in peer-reviewed journals.

== Views on climate change ==
After retirement, he had four and a half years in China and when he returned became a critic of the claim that climate was harmed by human emissions of greenhouse gases.

He commented on every publication of the Intergovernmental Panel on Climate Change, with 1,898 comments on the 2007 Report. He published critical studies on all of the reports, including a 2002 book The Greenhouse Delusion: A Critique of 'Climate Change 2001'. He published his autobiography Confessions of a Climate Sceptic in 2010 He was dismissive of anthropogenic global warming.

Gray called for the IPCC to be abolished, claiming it was “fundamentally corrupt” and that significant parts of the work of the IPCC, the data collection and scientific methods employed, were unsound.

Gray was featured on the Australian Broadcasting Corporation program Counterpoint in a debate entitled "Nine Lies about Global Warming", and was interviewed in a featured story in The New Zealand Herald as a "prominent" global warming nay-sayer.

In his book The Greenhouse Delusion: A Critique of "Climate Change 2001", Gray argued "that the quality and reliability of the IPCC's measurements are poor, the system of determining how much weight should be attributed to different influences on the earth's temperature is faulty, and the validity of evidence derived from computer modeling is questionable."

Gray died in Petone on 14 June 2018, aged 96.

== Publications ==
- The Greenhouse Delusion: A Critique of "climate Change 2001" (2002), ISBN 9780906522141
- The Global Warming Scam (2015), ISBN 9781941071236

== See also ==
- Climate change in New Zealand
