= Ara Ake =

- Established: 2020
- Head: Cristiano Marantes (2020–2025); Sophie Braggins (2026)
- Formerly called: National New Energy Development Centre
- Location: New Plymouth
- Website: www.araake.co.nz
- Dissolved: 2026

Ara Ake (originally the National New Energy Development Centre) was a New Zealand organisation set up in 2020 by the Labour government to develop clean energy technologies and help the country transition away from gas and oil exploration. It was abruptly disestablished by the National government in 2026.

== Origin ==
New Zealand's sixth Labour government decided in April 2018 to no longer issue offshore oil and gas exploration permits, and land-based permits for anywhere but Taranaki—which at the time had an active oil and gas sector employing over 7000 people. There was pressure on the government to develop alternative incomes for the region, and a "just transition" for the petrochemical industry.

The idea behind an energy development centre originated at a Just Transitions Summit held in New Plymouth, Taranaki, in 2019. It was announced in May 2019 as a future National New Energy Development Centre, with $27 million of government funding going to economic development agency Venture Taranaki to establish it. The centre's role was to trial renewable energy technologies, help New Zealand transition away from fossil fuels, and meet the government's goal of net zero carbon emissions by 2050. It was to employ 45 people and be accompanied with $20 million of contestable funding into clean energy research.

In July 2020, over a year after the announcement, Prime Minister Jacinda Ardern and Energy Minister Megan Woods formally launched the organisation under a Te Reo name Ara Ake (meaning "a pathway leading onwards and upwards"). Dr Cristiano Marantes, previously at energy company Vector, was appointed its CEO.

Ara Ake's three foundational partners were the MacDiarmid Institute for Advanced Materials and Nanotechnology, the Independent Electricity Generators Association, and the Taranaki Chamber of Commerce. Others included Carbon and Energy Professionals New Zealand, the National Energy Research Institute, and Elemental Excelerator. In 2023 Ara Ake was funded for a further 10 years with $70 million from the Ministry of Business, Innovation, and Employment. One of its goals was to forecast New Zealand's future energy demands, and develop plans to meet them with lower-emissions solutions. Amongst other projects, it worked on mapping New Zealand's offshore wind industry, and explored geothermal energy recovery from disused petroleum wells in Taranaki. In 2025 Ara Ake reported attracting $77 million of private investment and allocating $7.7 million of its own funds into businesses, targeting those needing development funds to attract industry investment.

== Dissolution ==
The 2023 election brought in a National coalition government which was more friendly to gas exploration and less supportive of decarbonisation. The chief executive of Ara Ake resigned abruptly in July 2025, after leading the organisation for five years; at the time he resigned Marantes was paid an annual salary of over $350,000 and oversaw 12 staff. During the search for a new chief executive one of the directors, Paul Goodeve, stepped in; he was replaced as interim chief executive in January 2026 by Ara Ake's general manager Sophie Braggins. Braggins was confirmed as chief executive in May 2026.

In the May 2026 budget, Energy Minister Simon Watts cut all funding for Ara Ake, effective 1 July that year, with the loss of 12 jobs. The decision was made with no announcement, no warning to the staff, no policy advice, and only revealed after examination of budget documents. The organisation's $6 million budget was redistributed to a broader $77 million package including solar grants for schools, the Energy Efficiency and Conservation Authority (Eeca), which Watts's successor Simeon Brown considered Ara Ake to be duplicating the work of, and the $1.2 billion Gas Transition Loan Guarantee Scheme. Former Minister Megan Woods pointed out the energy efficiency work of Eeca was quite different from the clean energy goal of Ara Ake, whose mission was to help the country transition away from gas. Brown did not accept this as a priority, pointing to the government's $200 million fund for natural gas production and their plan to build a $1 billion LNG facility in Taranaki. The director of E Tū, Mat Danaher, said, "Ara Ake was meant to be Taranaki’s bridge to a secure future in new energy…Pulling its funding tells workers exactly how little that future matters to this Government."

== See also ==
- Climate change in New Zealand
