= Sid Hurst =

New Zealand university chancellor (1918–2016)

Sid Hurst OBE
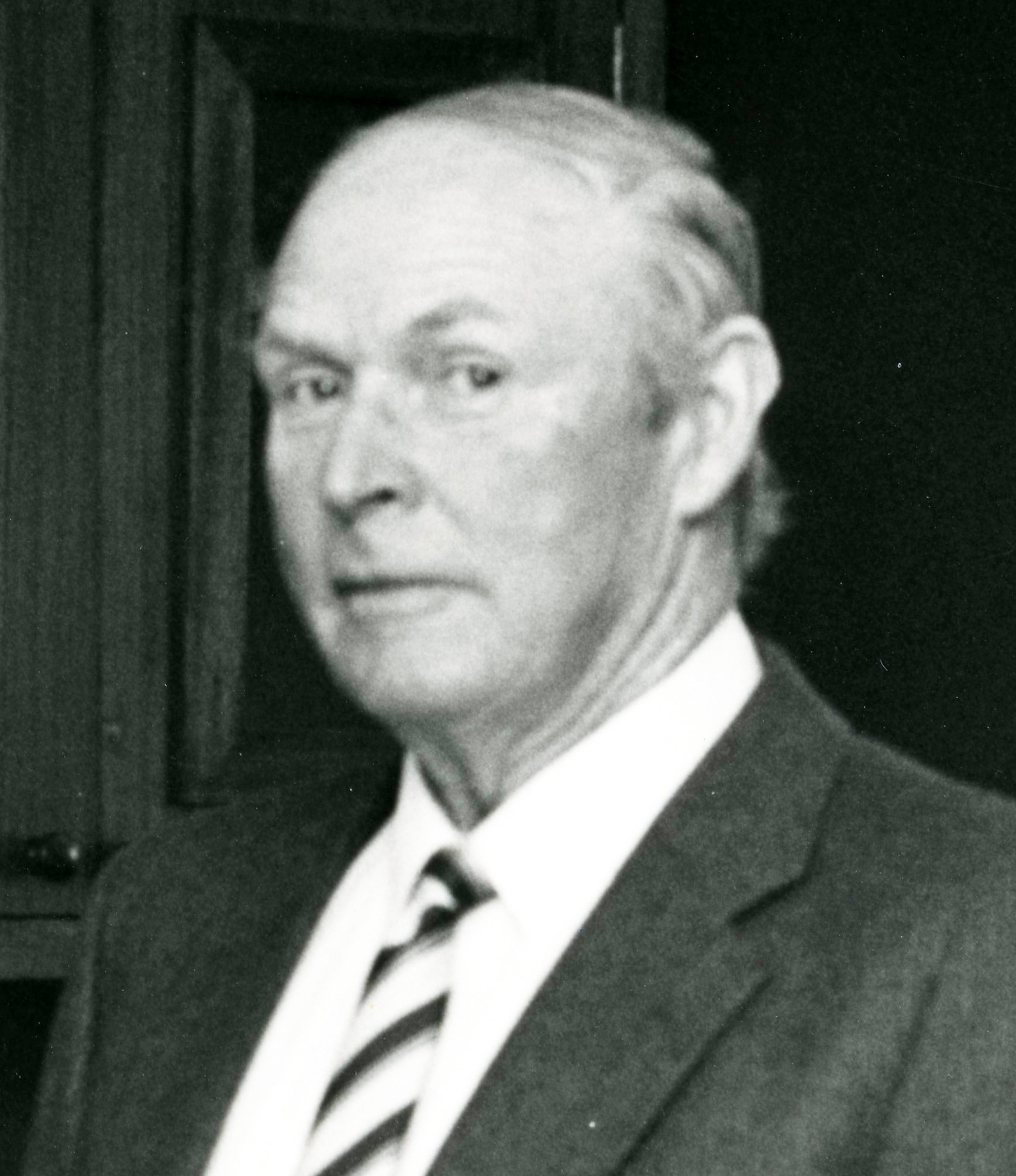
- Hurst in 1985

Chairman of Lincoln College
- In office 1980–1985
- Preceded by: Donald Bain
- Succeeded by: Allan Wright

Personal details
- Born: Sidney Murray Hurst; 12 August 1918 Oamaru, New Zealand
- Died: 21 July 2016 (aged 97) Oamaru, New Zealand
- Spouse: Hazel Irene Ludemann (m. 1941; died 2014)
- Occupation: Farmer

Sidney Murray Hurst OBE (12 August 1918 – 21 July 2016) was a New Zealand farmer and a pioneer of irrigation in North Otago. A member of the Lincoln College Council for 23 years, including six years as its chair, he advocated for the independence of the institution from the University of Canterbury.

== Biography ==
Born in Oamaru on 12 August 1918, Hurst was the son Archibald Campbell Hurst and Jessie McKenzie Murray. He was educated at Waitaki Boys' High School. He married Hazel Irene Ludemann in 1941, and the couple went on to have five children.

During World War II, Hurst served as a flight sergeant with the Royal New Zealand Air Force. He became a farmer and was involved in farming sheep, deer, cattle and dairy cows, as well as orcharding, farm forestry and beekeeping. He was a founding director of the meat exporting company Fortex and a life member of Federated Farmers.

Hurst was particularly associated with the development of irrigation in the Lower Waitaki basin from the 1960s. He was a leader of the Lower Waitaki irrigation scheme, which began operating in 1968, and later was a member of the board of the National Water and Soil Council.

Hurst served as a member of the Lincoln College Council between 1962 and 1985, the last six years of which as chairman. He was in the vanguard of those who advocated for the autonomy of Lincoln as a university of its own right, separate from its parent institution, the University of Canterbury.

Hurst died in Oamaru on 21 July 2016.

== Honours and awards ==
In the 1989 New Year Honours, Hurst was appointed an Officer of the Order of the British Empire, for services to agriculture and education. In 1990, he was awarded the New Zealand 1990 Commemoration Medal. In 1993, he was one of the first two recipients of an honorary Doctor of Science degree from Lincoln University. Hurst received the inaugural J.R. Cocks Memorial Award for outstanding leadership in irrigation from Irrigation New Zealand in 2008.
