= New Zealand Climate Science Coalition =

New Zealand climate change denial organisation

The New Zealand Climate Science Coalition was a anthropogenic climate change denial organisation in New Zealand, formed in 2006 with aim of "refuting what it believes were unfounded claims about anthropogenic global warming". The Coalition came to prominence in 2010 when it challenged the methodology and accuracy of NIWA's historical temperature records in court. The Coalition lost the case, could not afford to pay costs awarded against it and was forced into liquidation. There is an unrelated website called the New Zealand Climate Science Coalition which is an American blog also written by climate change deniers. The American website links to a different URL to the original URL associated with the New Zealand website which no longer exists.

== Claims ==
The Coalition was formed in April 2006 by a group including the botanist Professor David Bellamy who held the position that "climate science is not settled, that the world is not on the brink of a man-made global warming catastrophe".

In July 2006, Bryan Leyland, who claimed to be the acting chairman of the Coalition, issued a media release recommending the New Zealand government institute a Royal Commission on climate change claiming the public were "being given incomplete, inaccurate and biased information about the effects of increased concentrations of greenhouse gases in the atmosphere" when "global warming caused by man-made emissions of greenhouse gases ... cannot be substantiated". The Government refused on the grounds that the majority of climate scientists in the world agree that there is no longer any doubt that climate is changing due to human activity.

In April 2007, another member of the Coalition, Vincent R. Gray, described the IPCC Fourth Assessment Report as "dangerous unscientific nonsense" and "lacking in scientific rigour". Mr Gray spent much of his retirement criticising the IPCC.

== Legal action ==
In August 2010, the Coalition commenced legal action against the National Institute of Water and Atmospheric Research, asking the High Court to invalidate its official temperature record, to prevent it using the temperature record when advising Government and to require the National Institute of Water and Atmospheric Research to produce a "full and accurate" temperature record. Coalition spokesman, Bryan Leyland, acknowledged that the earth had been warming for 150 years, but claimed it had not heated as much as NIWA claimed.

In 2012, the High Court declined all claims and ruled that the Coalition pay NIWA's costs. In his decision, Justice Venning said: "I am satisfied that the methodology applied by NIWA was in accordance with internationally recognised and credible scientific methodology." The Coalition was ordered to pay NIWA $89,000 in costs after losing the case. When the Coalition refused to pay, NIWA pursued liquidation. When asked about its assets, Bryan Leyland said: "To my knowledge, there is no money. We spent a large amount of money on the court case, there were some expensive legal technicalities." He acknowledged that funding had come "from a number of source, which are confidential" to take the case to court. In 2007, the Heartland Institute, which rejects mainstream scientific information about man-made climate change, granted the Coalition US$25,000 (NZ$32,000) sending the money to NZCSC member Owen McShane.

== Scientific credibility of Coalition members ==
In making his decision in favour of NIWA, Justice Venning noted that at least two of the people representing the Coalition at court did not have scientific qualifications in the field of climate science. On that basis, he ruled that evidence presented by Terry Dunleavy, a former journalist who was a founding member of the trust was inadmissible. He said: Dunleavy "has no applicable qualifications" and "his interest in the area does not sufficiently qualify him as an expert". Justice Venning also questioned the credentials of Bob Dedekind, a computer modelling and statistical analyst whose "general expertise in basic statistical techniques does not extend to any particular specialised experience of qualifications in the specific field of applying statistical techniques in the field of climate science".

Tim Lambert writing in ScienceBlogs said "The New Zealand Climate Science Coalition isn't made up of climate scientists, but is just a group of global warming skeptics who gave themselves a fancy title. And they just got caught combining temperature data from different places to get rid of the inconvenient warming trend in New Zealand." The following individuals have been involved in the Coalition:

- Vincent R. Gray, who used to criticise the IPCC reports, had a vested interest in denying the impact of human induced climate change by virtue of his role as Chief Chemist of the Coal Research Association. Now deceased.
- Owen McShane was a founding member of the Coalition and had a background in architecture and town planning. A search of Google Scholar reveals he never published any articles in peer-reviewed journals on the subject of climate change. Now deceased.
- David Bellamy: A search of Google Scholar reveals that David Bellamy has published only one article in a journal on the subject of climate change: "Carbon is the World's Best Friend," co-published by Bellamy and Jack Barrett, was published in the Energy & Environment (E&E), a journal edited by climate change denier Sonja Boehmer-Christiansen. Now deceased.
- Augie Auer: Had degrees in Atmospheric Science from Colorado State University (1965) and Professional Meteorology from St. Louis University (1962). In New Zealand he worked as the chief meteorologist for the MetService. After Auer retired, Metservices new chief meteorologist Neil Gordon said that Auer had used the term "former MetService chief meteorologist" in public statements denying global warming. Gordon said: "We want to make it very clear in the public's mind that we do not agree with what he is saying." Now deceased.

== See also ==
- Heartland Institute
- Climate change in New Zealand
