= Jan Wright =

New Zealand Parliamentary Commissioner for the Environment

Dame Jan Wright DNZM CRSNZ
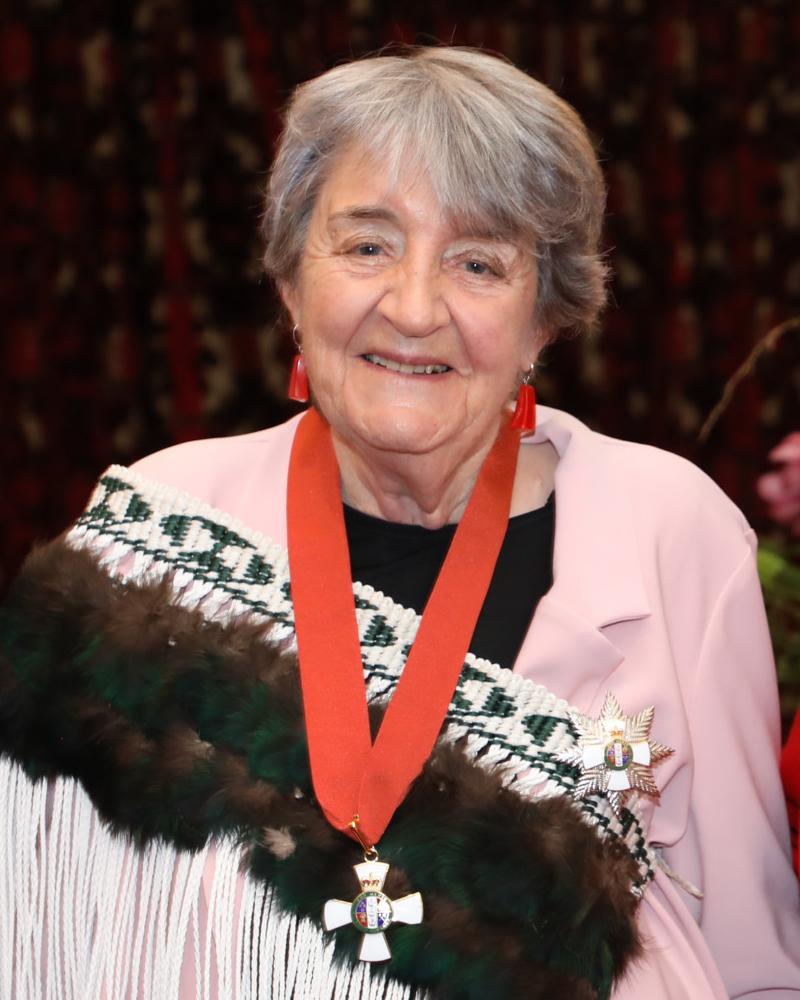
- Wright in 2023

3rd Parliamentary Commissioner for the Environment
- In office March 2007 – October 2017
- Preceded by: Morgan Williams
- Succeeded by: Simon Upton

Personal details
- Born: Janice Claire Wright
- Scientific career
- Education: Harvard University
- Fields: Public policy
- Thesis: Investments that save lives: the norms of environmental and medical decision making (1997)

Dame Janice Claire Wright DNZM CRSNZ was New Zealand's third Parliamentary Commissioner for the Environment. She was sworn in as Parliamentary Commissioner for the Environment for a five-year term on 5 March 2007, and was reappointed for a further five years in 2012.

Wright has a Physics degree from the University of Canterbury, a master's degree in Energy and Resources from University of California, Berkeley, and a PhD in Public Policy from the John F. Kennedy School of Government. Prior to her current role, Wright taught at Sir Edmund Hillary Collegiate in Ōtara, worked as an independent policy and economic consultant for many different NZ government agencies and as a member of various Crown entity boards. She was the board chairman of Land Transport New Zealand, and in that role was the presenter of the 2005 Cycle Friendly Awards.

In her role as Parliamentary Commissioner for the Environment Wright has criticised the Government a number of times for its policies towards the environment. In 2013 she criticised planned amendments to the Resource Management Act, saying it "is not, and should not become, an economic development act". In 2012 she said changes to the Emissions Trading Scheme would cost New Zealand in the long-term, criticising concessions made to big business. Earlier in 2012 she said the Government had "dropped the ball" on the environment.

Wright retired from the Commission at the end of her second term. She was replaced by former Environment Minister and OECD Environment head Simon Upton. In April 2018, Wright was announced as a member of the Interim Climate Change Committee, set up while a formal Climate Change Commission was established under the proposed Zero Carbon Act. In 2018 Wright became chair of conservation project Te Manahuna Aoraki.

Wright is a Companion of the Royal Society of New Zealand. In 2012, she was conferred with an honorary Doctor of Science degree by Lincoln University. In the 2023 New Year Honours, she was appointed a Dame Companion of the New Zealand Order of Merit, for services to the state and the environment.
