= Jim Salinger =

New Zealand climatologist (born 1947)

James Salinger CRSNZ
- Born: Dunedin, New Zealand
- Other name: Jim Salinger
- Education: BSc Otago University (1971) PhD Victoria University of Wellington (1981) MPhil (Env.Law) 1st class honours Auckland University (1999)
- Known for: Scientific work on climate change

Michael James Salinger CRSNZ (born 25 April 1947) is a New Zealand climate change researcher and teacher who has worked for a range of universities in his home country and around the world. He was a senior climate scientist for a Crown Research Institute, the National Institute of Water and Atmospheric Research (NIWA), and President of the Commission for Agricultural Meteorology of the World Meteorological Organization (WMO). He has received several awards and other honours for his work with climate change and is involved in researching and monitoring past and current climate trends. Within his area of specialist scientific knowledge, Salinger has co-authored and edited a range of reports, articles and books. He was involved in an employment dispute and elements of his theory and practice were at the centre of a case against NIWA.

== Career ==
Salinger was a scientist at the University of Otago Medical School from 1972–1975. He then lectured in geography at Victoria University of Wellington, (1976–1979), and was a senior research associate at the University of East Anglia in England, (1980–1981). He worked for the Meteorological Service of New Zealand from 1982 until 1992, initially as the senior agricultural meteorologist, and later in the role of principal scientist, and from 1986 to 2010, was New Zealand's principal delegate to the World Meteorological Organization's Commission for Agricultural Meteorology (CAgM). From 2006 to 2010, he served as its ninth president, and in 2018, won an award for his exceptional service.

Between 2004 and 2007, Salinger was an honorary associate professor in the Department of Geography and Environmental Science at the University of Auckland and within that timeframe, became a principal scientist for the National Institute of Water and Atmospheric Research (NIWA). In 2011 he was an honorary research fellow, at the University of Tasmania, Australia, the Lorry I. Lokey Visiting Professor, Woods Institute for the Environment, at Stanford University in 2012, and from February to March 2014, a visiting scholar, at the Institute of Marine and Antarctic Studies, University of Tasmania, Hobart, Australia. At that time he was a Ernst Frohlich Fellow CSIRO Marine Sciences, Hobart In 2018 Salinger was a visiting professor in the Department of Geography and Environmental Studies at the University of Haifa, Israel, and from February – May 2019, a visiting scholar in the Department of Meteorology at The Pennsylvania State University, State College, PA, USA. Between August – December 2019 he served as a visiting professor at the Institute of Biometeorology, Consiglio Nazionale delle Ricerche, University of Florence, Rome, Italy.

Salinger was research associate for the Tasmanian Institute for Agriculture at the University of Tasmania, Hobart, Australia in (2019–2020) and is currently the international climate change expert for the Climate Reference Group, Queenstown New Zealand-Lakes District Council. As of 2024, he is adjunct research fellow at School of Geography, Environmental and Earth Sciences, Victoria University of Wellington.

== Public policy positions ==
=== IPPC and NIWA Reports ===
A report from the Intergovernmental Panel on Climate Change (IPPC) was prepared in 2018 following the signing of the Paris Agreement in 2016. In the New Zealand news media, the report was discussed in terms of how it may impact the achievement of the goals in the Paris Agreement. During the discussion, Jim Salinger said the report showed the difference between the impacts of 1.5 °C and 2 °C is earth-shattering and as an example "coral reefs would decline by 70 to 90 per cent with global warming of 1.5°C, whereas more than 99 per cent would be lost with two degrees". Salinger further said species loss and extinction are projected to be significantly lower at 1.5 °C of global warming compared to 2 °C. The NIWA Annual Climate Summary (2018), confirmed the concerns about the increase in temperature in New Zealand and Salinger noted that the NIWA Seasonal Climate Outlook foreshadowed increased temperatures.

=== Melting of glaciers ===
Salinger has expressed concerns about the heatwave in New Zealand in 2017/18, in particular warning against the glaciers in that country melting and flowing into the rivers. He explained the climate effect on glaciers from Southern Annular Mode (SAM), a ring of climate variability around the South Pole with "alternating windiness and storm activity ...[that can]...increase the risk or unsettled weather conditions". According to Salinger, the effects of the Southern Annular Mode had caused the record hot summer of 2017/18 and triggered a large ice melt. The research also showed the effect the heatwave had on the seawater temperatures around the South Island of New Zealand, disrupting the patterns of fish movements and negatively impacting the kelp forests along the Otago coastline. It concluded that it was most likely the heatwave would not have happened without anthropogenic climate change (man-made) influence. Concerns about the extreme weather continued to be shared by Salinger and he noted that in 2018, New Zealand had its warmest year ever since the first records in 1867, and this was accompanied by warm seas for all months of the year, with sea surface temperatures well above average. After the UK Met Office predicted that 2019 would be close to a record, Salinger claimed this to be "due to global heating, and the added effect of the El Niño in the Tropical Pacific".

=== NZ Government tree planting plan ===
In October 2018, the NZ Labour Government, a coalition with NZ First, announced a goal to plant one billion trees over 10 years (between 2018 and 2017). The Forestry Minister, Shane Jones said applicants for the grants "could be looking to plant for reduced erosion, improved water quality, the development of Māori-owned land or to diversify productive land uses". It was also claimed that this programme would allow greater absorption of CO_{2} from the atmosphere and turn it into wood which would hold carbon for as much as hundreds of years and that it would also reduce erosion. The government said this was an acknowledgement of the commitment to the Paris 21 Agreement. Salinger challenged this, noting that in the first year of the programme only 12 per cent were native trees, and "ideally 90 per cent of the trees planted would be native species as they store more carbon". The Forestry Minister Mr Jones, answered that it was a lot cheaper to plant pines.

=== Calls for action ===
A letter from Salinger to his grandchildren in October 2020, stated that the "current summer is an example of the future that we baby boomers are bequeathing you if we keep continuing the emissions of greenhouse gases that we have been doing in the late 20th and early 21st century". In an interview with the NZ Herald newspaper in 2019, Salinger had previously urged action on climate change and to heed the "dire warning that we must hasten our action on reducing emissions as time [was] running out". This supported a similar call for action by Salinger in 2012 for New Zealand to honour its global obligations. In 2020, concerned with the lack of action on climate change during the COVID-19 pandemic, Salinger worked with a group of climate activists to create a video calling for the New Zealand government to "put climate change at the forefront of every decision made". As a follow-up to this, on behalf of the nine Intergenerational Climate Ambassadors, which included Sir Alan Mark, James Renwick and Lucy Lawless, Salinger confirmed that the Intergenerational Open Letter For Climate Change Now would be delivered, after the 2020 election, to the New Zealand Government with speeches outside Parliament. The press release concluded with: "Through the response to COVID-19, we have seen the power of people to act as a collective. It is time to see climate action and climate justice, this really is our moment across all generations. We are out of time – we have had the Pandemic – and it is time for action by all." On Wednesday 10 December 2020, members of the Intergenerational Climate Ambassadors group, including Salinger, met with James Shaw, the Climate Change Minister in the New Zealand government. Salinger expressed frustration at the lack of action by successive New Zealand governments in responding to climate change, noting that floods in Napier in 2020 highlighted the effects of weather-related disasters. He stressed the importance of actions such as agreeing to implement the Climate Change Commission's recommendations and providing support to farmers in switching to regenerative agriculture so that New Zealand will not be seen as a "global perpetrator because of their huge emissions". Shaw said that he would take the group's sentiments to Parliament.

=== Continued concerns about heatwaves ===
Concerns were raised by Salinger and James Renwick in January 2019 about how the heatwaves from 2018 were "leading to early grape harvests and killing farmed fish in parts of New Zealand...[and]...if emissions [kept] increasing as they have done in recent years, last summer [would] seem cool by the standards of 2100".

In July 2020, Salinger and Lisa Alexander, (Climate Change Research Centre, UNSW Sydney, New South Wales, Australia), noted that based on research, New Zealand and Australia were experiencing extremes of rain and temperatures and "a major global update based on data from more than 36,000 weather stations around the world [confirmed] that, as the planet [continued] to warm, extreme weather events such as heatwaves and heavy rainfall [were] now more frequent, more intense, and longer". In an article in the New Zealand Herald, in September 2020, Salinger also said the "chances of a La Niña climate system playing with our weather over coming months was now highly likely, while the potential for a marine heatwave certainly has our attention".

In October 2020, a major forest fire ripped through the Mackenzie Basin New Zealand, and resulted in the evacuation of Lake Ohau Alpine Village, with several homes destroyed by the flames. The Science Reporter in the New Zealand Herald (5 October 2020) shared information from a fire scientist, Grant Pearce who thought that the fire may have come from a spark on powerlines, but had more likely been fuelled by dry pastures at a time when a La Niña climate system was bringing "stronger westerly to north-westerly winds, instead of south-westerly winds usually seen at [that] time of year". In the same article, Salinger indicated a clear link to climate change, with local temperatures much higher than normal for this time of the year, possibly confirming La Niña.

== Awards and honours ==
2024: Kiwibank New Zealander of the Year. This was in recognition of almost 50 years as a scientist who "advanced climate science" by addressing global warming.

2019: Jubilee Medal, the premier award from the New Zealand Institute of Agricultural and Horticultural Science for lifetime achievements in climate and agricultural science.

2018: World Meteorological Organization Award for Exceptional Service and Outstanding Contributions to the Commission for Agricultural Meteorology.

2016: Semi-Finalist, New Zealander of the Year Awards.

2007: IPCC Nobel Peace Prize contributor.

2001: Companion of the Royal Society of New Zealand (CRSNZ) for Services to the Society, and the promotion of climate and climate science to the public.

1994: NZ Science and Technology medal from the Royal Society of New Zealand.

== Controversies ==
=== Employment issue ===
On 23 April 2009, Salinger was dismissed by NIWA, ostensibly for breaching NIWA's media policy. Salinger had represented NIWA to the public and media for many years and the dismissal caused a "wide public outcry" according to the Otago Daily Times. In late May 2009, Salinger stated that mediation with NIWA over the dismissal had failed and that he would be lodging a claim with the Employment Relations Authority. On 19 October 2009, the Employment Relations Authority in Auckland began a hearing into Salinger's dismissal. During the hearing it emerged the Salinger had suffered from depression. In December 2009, the Employment Relations Authority upheld Salinger's dismissal.

=== Case against NIWA ===
On 5 July 2010, The New Zealand Climate Science Education Trust (NZCSET), associated with the New Zealand Climate Science Coalition, filed a legal case against the National Institute of Water and Atmospheric Research (NIWA) claiming that the organisation had used a methodology to adjust historic temperature data that was not in line with received scientific opinion. The Coalition lodged papers with the High Court asking the court to rule that the official temperatures record of NIWA were invalid. The Coalition later claimed that the "1degC warming during the 20th century was based on adjustments taken by Niwa from a 1981 student thesis by then student Jim Salinger...[and]...the Salinger thesis was subjective and untested and meteorologists more senior to Salinger did not consider the temperature data should be adjusted". The case was dismissed, with the judgement concluding that the "plaintiff does not succeed on any of its challenges to the three decisions of NIWA in the issue. The application for judicial review is dismissed and judgment entered for the defendant". On 11 November 2013, the Court of Appeal of New Zealand dismissed an appeal by the Trust against the award of costs to NIWA. NIWA Chief Executive John Morgan said the organisation was pleased with the outcome, stating that there had been no evidence presented that might call the integrity of NIWA scientists into question.

There was concern in 2014 that the New Zealand Climate Science Education Trust had not paid the amount of $89,000 to NIWA as ordered by the High Court, and this was a cost to be borne by the taxpayers of New Zealand. Trustee Bryan Leyland, when asked about its assets, said: "To my knowledge, there is no money. We spent a large amount of money on the court case, there were some expensive legal technicalities...[and that]...funding had come from a number of sources, which are confidential." Shortly after that, the New Zealand Climate Science Education Trust (NZCSET) was put into formal liquidation. On 23 January 2014, Salinger stated that this "marked the end of a four-year epic saga of secretly-funded climate denial, harassment of scientists and tying-up of valuable government resources in New Zealand". He also explained the background to the issue around the Seven-station New Zealand temperature series (7SS) and how he felt this had been misrepresented by the Trust.

== Selected publications ==
- Climate Change 2001 – Synthesis Report (2001). While with the IPCC, in his role with NIWA, Salinger worked with scientists from around the world on producing this document which provided information for policymakers.
- Climate Change in New Zealand: Scientific and Legal Assessments (2002). In his review of this book which was co-authored by Salinger, Michael Jeffery QC, Professor of Law at Macquarie University concluded that the book "affords both the expert and the non-expert a concise and focused insight into the core issues underlying the phenomenon of climate change from a scientific perspective and then proceeds to discuss in an ordered fashion how these issues are likely to be addressed by New Zealand in the context of the United Nations Framework Convention on Climate Change and the Kyoto Protocol".
- Salinger, Michael James; M. V. K. Sivakumar; Raymond P. Motha, eds. (2005). Increasing Climate Variability and Change. Springer Science+Business Media. doi:10.1007/1-4020-4166-7. ISBN 978-1-4020-3354-4. LCCN 2008297225. OCLC 62154883. OL 8371436M. Wikidata Q58241009.
- Annual Climate Summaries (2000–2007). These documents were completed when Salinger was in his role as principal scientist, NIWA National Climate Centre, Auckland. He worked with a climatologist and a communications manager, and coordinated each report which contained information on a single year's overall climate conditions, sunshine, temperature, soil moisture and temperature in New Zealand.
- Prediction of Fire Weather and Fire Danger (2007). Salinger co-authored this publication that was commissioned for the New Zealand Fire Commission to "provide methods for forward prediction of severe fire weather".
- Climate Change 2007: Working Group II: Impacts, Adaptation and Vulnerability Report (2007). Salinger was a lead author of this when working with the Intergovernmental Panel on Climate Change, an organisation which was awarded a Nobel Peace Prize in 2007 "for their efforts to build up and disseminate greater knowledge about man-made climate change, and to lay the foundations for the measures that are needed to counteract such change".
- Climate Trends, Hazards and Extremes – Taranaki Synthesis Report (2008). When working for NIWA, Salinger co-authored this report that was prepared for the New Plymouth District Council, the Taranaki Regional Council and South Taranaki District Council, for the purpose of identifying "climate trends, hazards and extremes that [were] likely to impact on the region as a result of climate warming during the 21st century".
- Living in a Warmer World. How a Changing Climate will Affect Our Lives (2013). This book was edited by Salinger with contributions from notable scientists. One reviewer acknowledged that "Salinger has drawn on all the relationships he has built up over a 40-year career as a climate scientist, including a spell as president of the WMO Commission for Agricultural Meteorology, to bring together some of the world's leading experts on climate impacts". Brian Giles, reviewing the book in the Weather and Climate Journal, concluded that "the book does give a useful insight into the way that global warming will affect humankind in the 21st century as viewed in 2011 and 2012".
- New Zealand climate: patterns of drought 1941/42 – 2012/13 (2014). This is an article co-authored by Salinger and submitted in Weather and Climate, the official journal of the Meteorological Society of New Zealand in 2014. In the Abstract, the authors noted that despite New Zealand's maritime location, drought was still an issue and responses to this needed to be on a regional level due to "New Zealand's complex geography...[which gave]...distinctive regional climatic responses to variations in atmospheric circulation".
- The unprecedented coupled ocean-atmosphere summer heatwave in the New Zealand region 2017/18: drivers, mechanisms and impacts (2019). This was co-edited by Salinger who noted in the publication that "the impacts from such heatwaves are dire – for example, last summer's warm conditions caused massive ice loss in South Island glaciers...[and]...life in the oceans around us was significantly disrupted: coastal seaweed forests struggled to grow, farmed salmon in the Marlborough Sounds died and Queensland groper occurred in Northland – 3000km out of range...yet another dire warning that we must hasten our action on reducing emissions as time is running out".
- Shifting Jewry 2019 (GEN19) A Survey of the New Zealand Jewish Community (2019). Salinger was one of a team who completed four surveys on the New Zealand Jewish community on behalf of B'nai B'rith, an international not-for-profit Jewish community services organisation that supports human rights and anti-discrimination
- Unparalleled coupled ocean-atmosphere summer heatwaves in the New Zealand (2020). Co-edited by Salinger, this article recorded and interpreted data to show how intense heatwaves on land and sea surfaces were resulting in the rapid melting of snow in the Southern Alps of New Zealand; below-average berry numbers and bunch masses of Sauvignon blanc and Pinot noir wine grapes; earlier harvest than normal of cherries and apricots; lower yields of grain and potatoes; and species disruption in marine ecosystems. In the Abstract, it was stated, hindcasts indicate that the heatwaves were either atmospherically driven or arose from combinations of atmospheric surface warming and oceanic heat advection".
- Surface temperature trends and variability in New Zealand and surrounding oceans: 1871–2019 (2020). Co-authored by Salinger, this study compared maximum, minimum, and mean air temperature averaged over New Zealand for the period 1871–2019 with data gathered from the surrounding ocean. The study showed that temperatures over the New Zealand Exclusive Economic Zone had increased by 0.66 °C from 1871–2019. NZ Herald Science Reporter, Jamie Morton said the study showed that there were specific cyclical changes in the Pacific ocean-atmospheric system which affected the New Zealand climate, resulting in swings between La Niña years which resulted in above-average temperatures with more northeasterly winds, and El Niño periods when temperatures were cooler due to southwesterly winds. Salinger explained in the Herald article how the temperatures were affected by Southern Annular Mode and volcanic eruptions but confirmed that clear trends had emerged with climate change and when these trends came in "tandem with natural drivers that had historically made for balmier conditions, New Zealand saw extremely warm years"
