= Morgan Williams (ecologist) =

New Zealand ecologist and agricultural scientist

Morgan Williams QSO
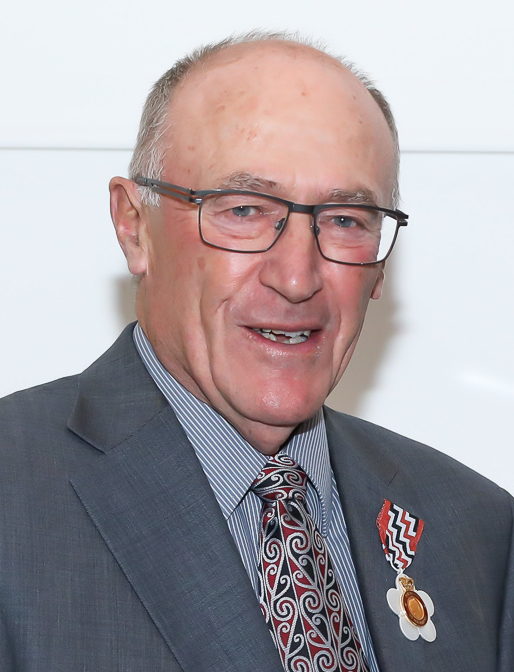
- Williams in 2020

2nd Parliamentary Commissioner for the Environment
- In office 1997 – March 2007
- Preceded by: Helen Hughes
- Succeeded by: Jan Wright

Personal details
- Born: 25 March 1943 (age 83)
- Relations: Morgan Williams (grandfather)
- Scientific career
- Education: University of Bath
- Fields: Ecology
- Thesis: The ecology and behaviour of rattus species in relation to the yield of Coconuts and cocoa in Fiji (1974)

John Morgan Williams QSO (born 25 March 1943) is a New Zealand ecologist and agricultural scientist who served as the Parliamentary Commissioner for the Environment from 1997 to March 2007.

Educated at Rangiora High School, Williams obtained a MSc from the University of Canterbury, studying biology and ecology, and then studied at the University of Bath where he completed a PhD in population ecology. He worked in Antarctica and Fiji before returning to New Zealand where he worked for the Ministry of Agriculture and Fisheries in research, management and policy for 21 years. In January 1996, he joined Agriculture New Zealand Limited, a Wrightson Group company, and the following year he was appointed New Zealand's second Parliamentary Commissioner for the Environment.

Williams joined the board of WWF-New Zealand in 2009 and was elected chair in 2012, serving in that role until May 2019.

In the 2020 New Year Honours, Williams was appointed a Companion of the Queen's Service Order, for services to the State and the environment.
