= Ollie Langridge =

- Born: 3 May 1964 (age 61)
- Occupation(s): Self-employed and climate activist
- Years active: 2019–present

Ollie Langridge (born 3 May 1964) is a climate change and environmental crisis activist from New Zealand.

== Biography ==
Langridge is self-employed and lives in the Wellington suburb of Thorndon. He has six children.

On 14 May 2019, Langridge began sitting on the lawn outside the New Zealand Parliament Buildings holding a sign calling on the Government to declare a climate change emergency.

There was a tipping point for me with the release of the UN Climate Report on the 9th of May, which indicated that we, the way we are living, is threatening the extinction of one million species. And I thought this is madness. I literally walked up from my desk, I went down to the hardware store. I got the stuff for a sign with the paint. I came down here with the sign on day 1; the paint was still wet. There's an awful lot of people who don't know what to do, they don't know how to react. And I count myself as one of those people. I just see myself as one of those people. I just see myself as a normal guy who doesn't know what to do. And this is the best thing I can think of.

— Ollie Langridge

Langridge says he has no political affiliation or ties to climate change advocacy groups describing himself as "a man worried about the future he's leaving for his children." Langridge said "he would not leave Parliament until the Government declares a climate change emergency and that he would be outside all day, every day until it happened." From 28 July, Langridge set a record as the longest running protest outside Parliament in New Zealand's history. Langridge's protest achieved international attention. The Swedish activist, Greta Thunberg, has shared his online updates and thousands have followed his strike on social media.

When he started, Langridge was mostly there by himself. Two months later (in late July), sometimes there were 30 people supporting him at lunchtimes. He said that by then, Green MPs James Shaw, Chlöe Swarbrick and Gareth Hughes had visited him to chat, as had Labour MP, Dr Deborah Russell. "But nobody from National yet."

After protesting outside Parliament every day for 100 days, Langridge cut back his presence to Fridays only, saying he wanted to spend more time with his wife and children.
