= Helen Hughes (botanist) =

New Zealand botanist and teacher (1929–2024)

Helen Hughes CBE CRSNZ
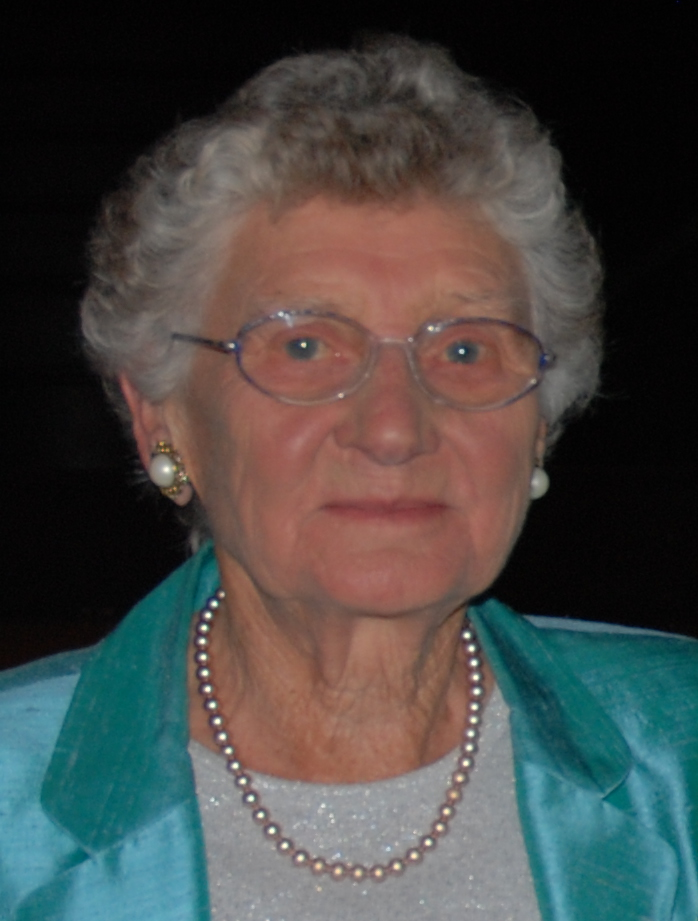
- Hughes in 2007

1st Parliamentary Commissioner for the Environment
- In office 1987–1996
- Succeeded by: Morgan Williams

Personal details
- Born: Helen Hannah Rigg; 29 August 1929 Nelson, New Zealand
- Died: 23 November 2024 (aged 95) Seatoun, Wellington, New Zealand
- Spouse: David Crowther Hughes
- Relations: Theodore Rigg (father); Kathleen Curtis (stepmother)
- Education: Canterbury University College

Helen Hannah Rigg Hughes CBE CRSNZ (née Rigg; 29 August 1929 – 23 November 2024) was a New Zealand botanist. She served as New Zealand's first Parliamentary Commissioner for the Environment, from 1987 to 1996.

== Background ==
Hughes was born Helen Hannah Rigg in Nelson on 29 August 1929, the daughter of agricultural scientist Theodore Rigg, who became director of the Cawthron Institute in 1933, and Esther Rigg (née White). She grew up in the suburb of Tāhunanui, and was educated at Nelson College for Girls, where she discovered her passion for botany. Rigg went on to complete a Master of Science degree with first-class honours in botany at Canterbury University College, graduating in 1952. Her thesis was titled An ecological survey of the pakihi lands of the Westport District, Nelson. She was awarded a Fulbright grant to travel to the United States, and studied at Vassar College from 1952 to 1954, earning a Master of Science degree.

Rigg married David Crowther Hughes in 1955, and the couple had four children. She died at her home in the Wellington suburb of Seatoun, on 23 November 2024, at the age of 95.

== Career ==
After returning to New Zealand from the United States, Helen Hughes taught at secondary schools in Christchurch and later Wellington. In 2017, she recalled that jobs for women in science at the time were hard to come by and there was "a bit of an old boys network operating".

Hughes' first science job was in Fiji for three years, working for the Fiji Department of Agriculture looking at water weed issues. She then worked for DSIR (Department of Scientific and Industrial Research) developing Environmental Impact reports. She moved on to become Assistant Commissioner for the Commission for the Environment, before becoming the first Parliamentary Commissioner for the Environment in 1987, following the creation of that role by the Environment Act 1986.

During her tenure, she wrote numerous reports and submissions on a variety of environmental issues, including flood mitigations following Cyclone Bola, controlling marine oil pollution, the environmental management of coal mining, and possum management.

From 1997 to 2002, Hughes was a member of the board of the Environmental Risk Management Authority. She also spent 13 years as a member of the Cawthron Institute's trust board.

Hughes wrote a biography of her father, A Quaker Scientist, published in 2005.

== Honours and awards ==
In 1990, Hughes was awarded the New Zealand 1990 Commemoration Medal. In 1993, she was one of the first two people to be awarded honorary doctorates by the newly independent Lincoln University, being conferred with an honorary DSc. Later that year, she was appointed a Commander of the Order of the British Empire in the 1993 Queen's Birthday Honours.

Hughes was a Companion of the Royal Society of New Zealand.
