= James Renwick (climate scientist) =

New Zealand climate scientist

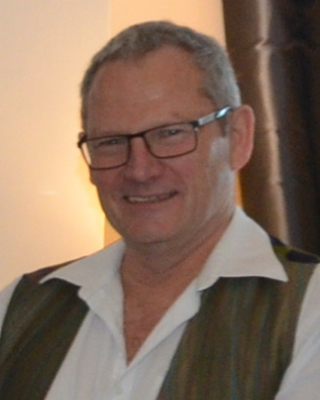
- Renwick in 2019
- Education: University of Canterbury (BSc); Victoria University of Wellington (MSc); University of Washington (PhD)
- Scientific career
- Fields: Climate science
- Workplaces: Victoria University

James Arthur Renwick is a New Zealand weather and climate researcher. He is professor of physical geography at Victoria University of Wellington, specialising in large-scale climate variations. He was awarded the 2018 New Zealand Prime Minister's Science Prize for Communication by Jacinda Ardern.

== Career ==
Renwick started his career as a weather forecaster at the New Zealand Met Service (1978–1991). From there he moved to seasonal prediction and climate change studies at National Institute of Water and Atmospheric Research (1992–2002), and then to his present teaching and research role at Victoria University of Wellington. His interests include Southern Hemisphere climate variability (such as the El Niño/La Niña cycle and the mid-latitude westerly winds) and the impacts of climate variability and change on New Zealand.

Renwick also works in climate-sea ice interaction.

Renwick was a Lead Author for the Intergovernmental Panel on Climate Change (IPCC) Fourth and Fifth Assessment Reports, as well as a Co-ordinating Lead Author for the IPCC's Sixth Assessment Report.

Renwick was President of the New Zealand Association of Scientists 2009–2011.

=== Science communication ===
Renwick is a well-known science communicator in New Zealand. The citation for his 2018 Prime Minister's Science Prize for Communication stated that he "communicates with warmth, humour and positivity, while always being clear about the seriousness of the issue". He communicates climate science in the context of art through an initiative called Track Zero.

== Honours and awards ==
Renwick received the Meteorological Society of New Zealand's Edward Kidson Medal in 2005. In 2018, he won the Prime Minister's Science Communication Prize.

In 2026, Renwick was awarded the Callaghan Medal by the Royal Society Te Apārangi. He is also a Companion of the Royal Society of New Zealand.
