= Parliamentary Commissioner for the Environment =

New Zealand government officer

- Te Kaitiaki Taiao a Te Whare Pāremata (Māori)
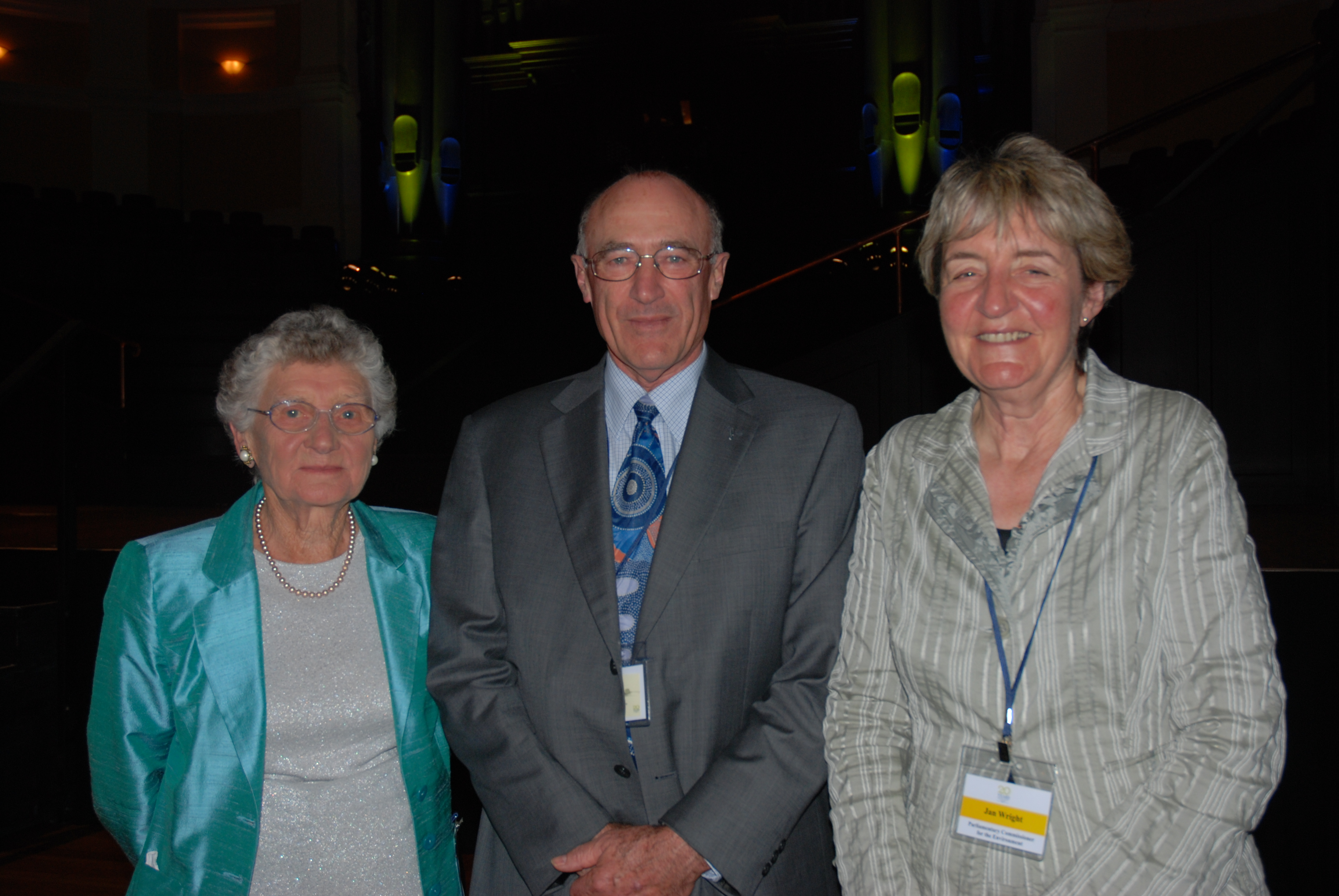
- New Zealand's first three Parliamentary Commissioners for the Environment (from left): Helen Hughes (1987–1997), Dr Morgan Williams (1997–2007), Dr Jan Wright (2007–2017)

Agency overview
- Jurisdiction: New Zealand
- Headquarters: Planit House, 22 The Terrace, Wellington, New Zealand
- Annual budget: Total budget for 2024/25; Vote Parliamentary Commissioner for the Environment $4,974,000
- Minister responsible: Gerry Brownlee, Speaker of the House of Representatives
- Agency executive: Simon Upton, Parliamentary Commissioner for the Environment
- Website: pce.parliament.nz

The Parliamentary Commissioner for the Environment (Māori: Te Kaitiaki Taiao a Te Whare Pāremata) is an independent Officer of the New Zealand Parliament appointed by the Governor-General on the recommendation of the House of Representatives for a five-year term under the Environment Act 1986. The Parliamentary Commissioner for the Environment replaced the Commission for the Environment, a Government agency which was formed in 1972.

== Role ==
The Commissioner is one of three officers of Parliament (the others being the Ombudsman and the Controller and Auditor-General) who are independent of the executive and who may review activities of the executive government and report directly to Parliament.

The Commissioner's role is to review and provide advice on environmental issues and the system of agencies and processes established by the Government to manage the environment. The primary objective of the office is to contribute to maintaining and improving the quality of the environment in New Zealand through advice given to Parliament, local councils, business, tangata whenua, communities and other public agencies.

The Commissioner may:

- investigate any matter where the environment may be, or has been adversely affected;
- assess the capability, performance and effectiveness of the New Zealand system of environmental management; and
- provide advice and information that will assist people to maintain and improve the quality of the environment.

== Commissioners ==
=== Commissioners for the environment ===
- Ian Baumgart (1974–1980)
- Ken Piddington (1980-1986) (John Hill Public Programs Officer and Research Policy Writer)

=== Parliamentary commissioners for the environment ===
	Name	Portrait	Term of office
1	Helen Hughes		1987–1996
2	Morgan Williams		1997–2007
3	Jan Wright		2007–2017
4	Simon Upton		2017–present
