= Leachman =

Leachman (/ˈliːtʃmæn/) is a surname. Notable people with the surname include:

- Andrew Leachman (1945–2017), New Zealand master mariner and writer
- Cloris Leachman (1926–2021), American actress
- Gerard Leachman (1880–1920), British soldier and intelligence officer
- Kristin Leachman (fl. 2010s), American contemporary artist
- Lamar Leachman (1932–2012), American football coach
- Robert E. Leachman (1806–1892), American lawyer, politician, and judge
- Silas Leachman (1859–1936), American pioneer recording artist
- Siobhan Leachman (fl. 2010s–2020s), New Zealand citizen scientist and Wikipedian

== Fictional characters ==
- Sara and Joe Leachman, characters in Andy Warhol's Bad

== See also ==
- Leechman, surname
