= Dave Lowe (atmospheric scientist) =

New Zealand climatologist

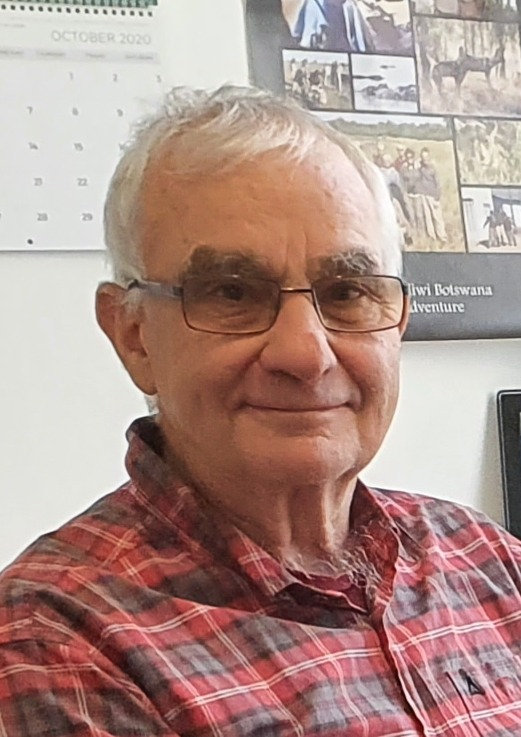
- Lowe in October 2020
- Born: David Charles Lowe; 1946 (age 79–80); New Zealand
- Education: New Plymouth Boys High School, New Zealand.; Masters of Physics Degree Victoria University, Wellington (1969).; PhD Atmospheric Chemistry University of Cologne, Germany.
- Known for: Atmospheric science

David Charles Lowe CRSNZ (born 1946) is a New Zealand atmospheric scientist who was instrumental in setting up the Baring Head atmospheric CO_{2} programme in 1972. A researcher and educator, Lowe was one of the lead authors of a 2007 Intergovernmental Panel on Climate Change (IPCC) report which was recognised with a Nobel Peace Prize.

Lowe has worked with others such as Charles David Keeling, to measure the amount of CO_{2} in the atmosphere and how this is contributing to climate change, in particular global warming. He is an adjunct professor of atmospheric chemistry at the Antarctic Research Centre, Victoria University of Wellington.

Lowe's memoir was published in 2021 and received favourable reviews in the New Zealand media.

== Early life and education ==
Lowe had a rural upbringing in Bell Block, Taranaki, New Zealand. He attended New Plymouth Boys High School but was "bullied and unhappy", so after three years and having gained School Certificate (New Zealand), left and worked in a telephone exchange. He became a keen surfer which heightened his awareness of the environment, noting that when he was out on the waves he "saw the atmosphere directly, going down into the ocean, mixing the sounds, the smells". This convinced him that he needed to understand more about the environment. Although he had no interest in furthering his education at this time, a local teacher Ray Jackson, noting his passion for the environment, suggested that he visit the local library and read around this topic. Lowe knew that to follow this interest, more education was necessary, so he returned to New Plymouth Boys High School for one year and gained The New Zealand University Entrance qualification, the minimum requirement for tertiary education. He completed a Master's degree in Physics at Victoria University, Wellington (1969) and moved to Germany where he lived and studied from 1978 to 1983. While in Germany he applied for a government scholarship to do a PhD in atmospheric chemistry at the University of Cologne and noted "that my wife and I had four wonderful years in Jülich, and at the end of my scholarship I had gained not only a PhD but also two children born in Germany – as well as an enduring affinity with the country, its language and people".

== Career ==
After graduating from Victoria University with a heightened interest in atmospheric science, Lowe accepted a position at the former Institute of Nuclear Sciences, Wellington, later to become the Department of Scientific and Industrial Research (New Zealand), a forerunner of Crown Research Institutes. While there, he worked with Athol Rafter, a scientist who was the first person to tell him about the effects of CO_{2} on the atmosphere. Lowe became aware of the work of Charles Keeling that was alerting the world to the possibility of anthropogenic contribution to the greenhouse effect and global warming. Keeling discussed the possibility of setting up a measuring station in New Zealand with Rafter and in 1970 Lowe was asked to coordinate this, culminating eventually in the establishment of what would be known as the Baring Head Clean Air Monitoring Station. From the beginning of the programme in 1972, this site has continued to record the rise of CO_{2} in the atmosphere.

In 1975 Lowe took a sabbatical and joined a group of scientists who went to California for the first conference of greenhouse gas experts. He stayed in California and worked with Keeling at the Scripps Institution of Oceanography for six months before returning to New Zealand to continue the work at Baring Head. For five years from 1978, while living in Germany and completing his PhD in atmospheric chemistry at University of Cologne, Lowe worked at several scientific institutes investigating the sources of atmospheric CO_{2} and methane.

Back in New Zealand, Lowe worked as a research scientist at the National Institute of Water and Atmospheric Research (NIWA), until the end of 2007, when he left to form a small company specialising in climate change education and promoting renewable energy. The same company contracts to the Ministry of Business, Innovation and Employment (MBIE) where Lowe served as the NZ / Germany science coordinator from 2012 – 2018. Until it concluded in 2016, Lowe coordinated funding support with an initiative known as FRIENZ that had the goal of facilitating research and innovation co-operation between Europe and New Zealand. He remains an adjunct professor of Atmospheric Chemistry at the Antarctic Research Centre, Victoria University of Wellington.

== Significant achievements ==
=== Baring Head Clean Air Monitoring Station ===
Lowe had a key role in establishing this station that since 1972 has been measuring CO_{2} in the atmosphere, with the longest continuous record of atmospheric CO_{2} in the Southern Hemisphere. His part in setting up the station began when he met Keeling – the inventor of the upward-climbing chart of atmospheric CO_{2} known as the Keeling Curve – who wanted somebody to start measuring in the Southern Hemisphere to see if CO_{2} growth matched what he was seeing in the north. Lowe found a windy, barren headland – Baring Head near the entrance to Wellington Harbour – and built an automatic air-sampling machine using parts from a telephone exchange. During a southerly, the Antarctic winds came straight over the ocean, and Lowe needed to know at Baring Head that there were no obstructions likely to change or affect that movement of air. After gathering data, Lowe and Keeling concluded that "the planet was breathing – in during the Northern Hemisphere growing season as plants sucked up more CO_{2}, out during the northern winter, when the deciduous trees dropped their leaves – but the amount of CO_{2} left in the atmosphere after each breath was rising". Scientists would later "fingerprint" the carbon to prove it was coming from people burning fossil fuels, and the Baring Head measuring station would expand to chart rising methane and other greenhouse gases. This data was used when the Intergovernmental Panel on Climate Change concluded in 2007 that it was very likely – 90 per cent certain – that rising greenhouse gases were to blame for most warming in global average temperatures since the mid 20th century. After eight years, the project was considered important enough to be handed over to another respected climate scientist, Martin Manning when Lowe won a scholarship to study in Germany.

Carbon Watch New Zealand, established in 2019, is a collaborative project to measure greenhouse gases and draws on the work done at Baring Point. In a podcast in 2020 related to this project Lowe recalled the early days at Baring Head. He also reiterated the importance of measuring CO_{2} and methane gases but explained that as the temperature of the atmosphere heats up, these gases drive an increase in water vapour which Lowe contended was a major cause of the temperature of the Earth rising, making water vapour "by far the strongest greenhouse gas".

=== Nobel Peace Prize ===
In 2007, Lowe was one of several New Zealand scientists who contributed toward the IPCC Fourth Assessment Report by the Intergovernmental Panel on Climate Change (IPCC), set up jointly by the World Meteorological Organization and the United Nations Environment Programme, to provide an authoritative international statement of scientific understanding of climate change. As a result of this work, the Nobel Peace Prize 2007 was awarded jointly to the IPCC and Al Gore "for their efforts to build up and disseminate greater knowledge about man-made climate change, and to lay the foundations for the measures that are needed to counteract such change". Lowe was a lead author for the section Changes in Atmospheric Constituents and in Radiative Forcing', Working Group 1 (The Physical Science Basis). The Royal Society of New Zealand Te Apārangi published a full list of the team of New Zealand researchers who contributed to this work, acknowledging the influence the group had on the project.

== Controversies ==
=== Rebuttal of climate change denial ===
In 2003, Chris de Freitas, then of Auckland University, challenged the scientific consensus that global warming caused by human activity was abruptly changing Earth's climate. Lowe, along with other National Institute of Water and Atmospheric Research (NIWA) scientists David Wratt and Brett Mullan all of whom had worked together on the 2001 Climate Change report, rebutted De Freitas's viewpoint. De Freitas had claimed that "atmospheric carbon dioxide levels [were] being stabilised by increased plant growth and other feedback mechanisms", but Lowe, Wratt and Mullan presented a graph depicting "steadily rising carbon dioxide levels measured at Baring Head between 1971 and 2002...[which showed]...that atmospheric levels of the gas are increasing steadily...[ and that]...worldwide surface temperature rises are real...and not due to urban effects, as de Freitas argued".

=== Collaboration on a popular book ===
In March 2008, Gareth Morgan, asked Lowe to assist him in evaluating the research on climate change for his book Poles Apart. Lowe, recently retired, was asked to led a small group of scientists, including marine geologist Lionel Carter, a colleague of Lowe's from the Antarctic Research Centre, Victoria University, to cover what was considered as the 'mainstream view' about climate change. Morgan's plan was to canvas the opinions of well-known climate denialists around the world and get Lowe and his team to provide commentaries on their seminal works. These critiques would be sent back to the denialists to get their responses. A significant work by climate change deniers critiqued by Lowe's team was Nature, Not Human Activity, Rules the Climate: Summary for Policymakers of the Report of the Nongovernmental International Panel on Climate Change, edited by Fred Singer. This document, produced shortly after the publication of the IPCC Fourth Assessment (2007), took the stance that the position of the IPCC did not provide a balanced view in the debate about Climate change. Lowe noted that it took his team "weeks to get to grips with the many inconsistencies, faulty citations and straw man arguments" in the Stringer document.

After the publication of the book, some mainstream scientists expressed concerns about the book and the involvement of Lowe in its production. Dr Andy Reisinger, who assisted with the book, noted that while it was impressive the authors engaged "directly with scientific literature, rather than following only second-hand arguments", it was problematic that their stated goal was to "settle as independent judge and jury". John McCrystal who co-authored the book, responded to Resinger's comments and stated that he and Morgan "didn't claim any special legal or scientific knowledge, just a willingness to apply ourselves, to the limits of our ability, to the expert testimony being presented".

Lowe, Adjunct Professor of Atmospheric Chemistry, Carter, Professor of Marine Geology and Barrett, Professor of Geology, later reflected on their experiences as the expert panel tasked with trying to convince economist Gareth Morgan that global warming is the result of human activity and concluded that "the book will have a huge impact with the New Zealand public".

== Publication of memoir ==
The Alarmist (2021) is Lowe's memoir that was originally to be called Atmosphere until he accepted the advice of his publishers to change it to Alarmist because he realised that was what he had become -"an alarmist in the sense of sounding the alarm about a very real threat to the Earth's biosphere, to the Earth's atmosphere". The book received many favourable reviews that backgrounded Lowe's life and struggles and eventual triumphs. Joel MacManus explored his difficult upbringing, the "brutally demanding work" under Charles Keeling, the breakdown in his marriage and the ongoing conflicts with climate change deniers, quoting Lowe as saying his story is one of "elation and despair", but that he is "optimistic because of his work as a mentor for youth-change climate action groups such as Fridays for Future". Jim Eagles said the book gives examples of Lowe's creativity and resilience as a scientist, "using what we like to think of as typical Kiwi ingenuity to conduct innovative experiments on the cheap: something well-illustrated by the cover photo of a young Lowe standing on the exposed edge of Wellington's Baring Head in the teeth of a howling gale to collect samples of air fresh from the Southern Ocean...[with]... a fascinating cast of characters, too: a few narrow-minded administrators and colleagues with their own agendas who considered climate research unimportant and a lot of dedicated scientists around the world seeking to find out what is happening to Earth's climate".

A review in The Spinoff by Clarrie Macklin, himself a glaciologist who had dealt with the harsh realities of climate change daily and the challenges of working with glaciers, said that Lowe's book was beginning to "thaw out the emotional stress...[and took him back]...to a time before flash computers and health and safety standards for research fieldwork – a mystical era known as the 1970s". Macklin continued that the book is "more than a piece of science history: it's a memoir, full of humour and enthusiasm, elation and despair...[revealing]... moments of scientific inspiration, yet usually with a beer, chippie bowl, or coffee at hand...[and]...the science Lowe describes is a monumental achievement; the ordeals he faced as one of the first witnesses of climate change are impressive". Another reviewer noted that the book is credible because Lowe is honest about the situation of climate change and explains the science without using jargon or scientific language. The reviewer said that "his style will really appeal to an audience that may not have considered reading up on climate change before, or wanted to but were just intimidated by the subject matter". Lowe himself contributed an edited extract from the book as an essay in The Guardian, concluding: "The challenges ahead are formidable but I truly believe that, given the will and with concerted action, human beings are more than capable of building a sustainable future." The New Zealand Listener headlined their review of the memoir with: "A Kiwi scientist's climate warning is lucid, persuasive and entertaining."

== Awards ==
Lowe was awarded the 2020 Wellingtonian of the Year Environmental Award.

In 2022, Lowe's book The Alarmist won the EH McCormick Prize for the best first work of general non-fiction in the Ockham New Zealand Book Awards. It was noted the book had "a rich texture of family and a clear awareness that members of the scientific community are not always in harmony. It is enlightening as well as very readable".

In 2026 Lowe was elected a Companion of the Royal Society Te Apārangi, for "his sustained and pioneering contribution to atmospheric science, and his communication on climate change".
