= National Institute of Water and Atmospheric Research =

New Zealand national research institute

- Taihoro Nukurangi (Māori)
- NIWA logo

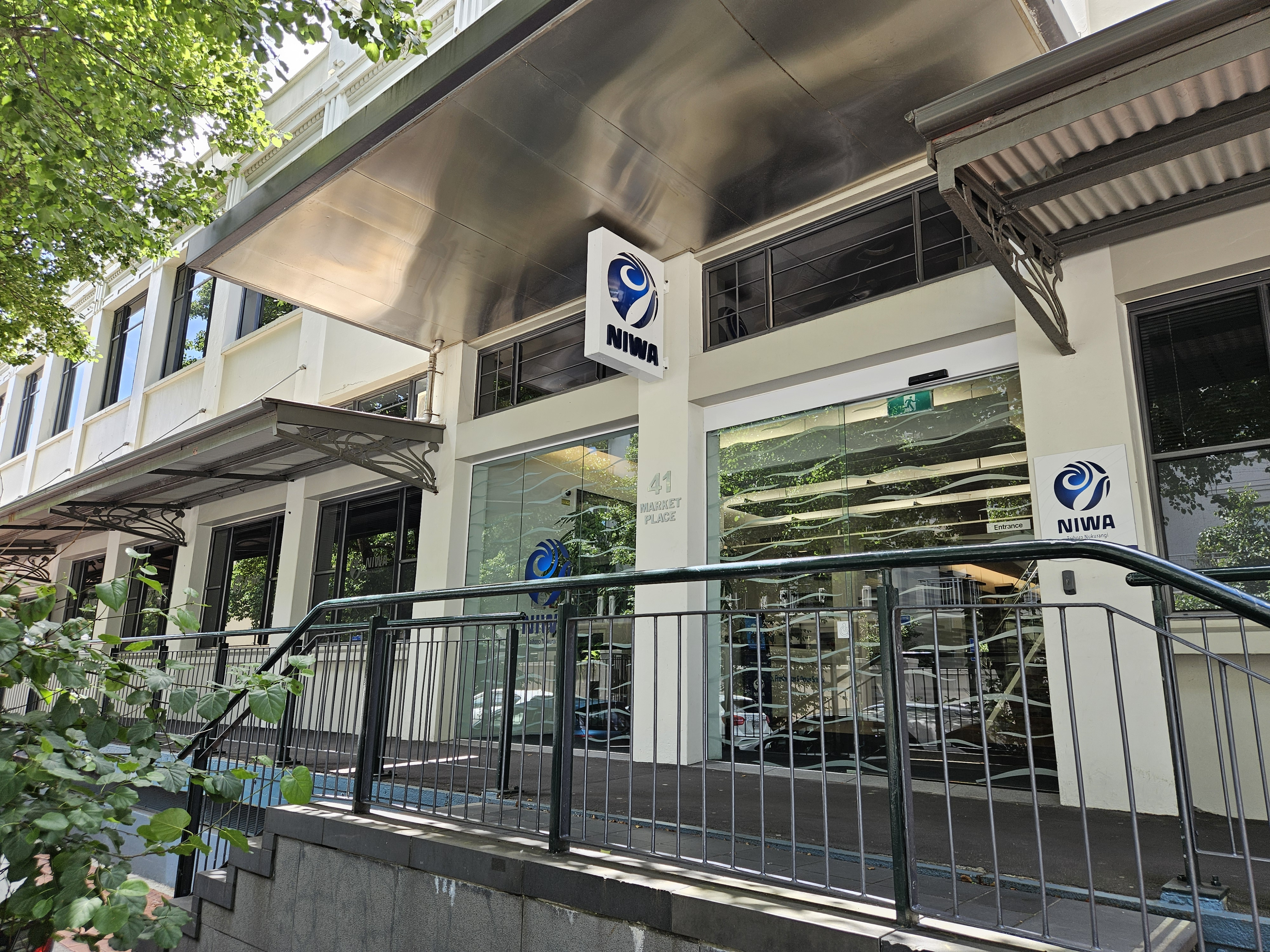
- NIWA head offices in Auckland, New Zealand

Agency overview
- Formed: 1992 (34 years ago)
- Superseding agency: Earth Sciences New Zealand
- Headquarters: 41 Market Place, Viaduct Harbour, Auckland
- Employees: 610
- Agency executives: John Morgan, Chief Executive; Barry Harris, Chair
- Website: niwa.co.nz

The National Institute of Water and Atmospheric Research or NIWA (Māori: Taihoro Nukurangi), was a Crown Research Institute of New Zealand. Established in 1992, NIWA conducted research across a broad range of disciplines in the environmental sciences. It also maintained nationally and, in some cases, internationally important environmental monitoring networks, databases, and collections.

As of 2019, NIWA had 697 staff spread across 14 sites in New Zealand and one in Perth, Australia. Its head office is in Auckland, with regional offices in Hamilton, Wellington, Christchurch, Nelson, and Lauder (Central Otago). It also had small field teams, focused mostly on hydrology, stationed in Bream Bay, Lake Tekapo, Rotorua, Napier, Whanganui, Greymouth, Alexandra, and Dunedin. NIWA maintained a fleet of about 30 vessels for freshwater, marine, and atmospheric research.

On 1 July 2025 NIWA became Earth Science New Zealand in a merger with GNS Science, as part of wider science reforms restructuring Crown Research Insitutes into Public Research Organisations.

== History ==
NIWA was formed as a stand-alone organisation in 1992 as part of a government initiative to restructure the New Zealand science sector. It was previously part of the Meteorological Service of the Ministry of Transport but was separated into a Crown entity focusing on long-term weather patterns and climate change.

Its foundation staff came mainly from the former Department of Scientific and Industrial Research (DSIR) and the Meteorological Service of the Ministry of Transport. One of the DSIR divisions absorbed was the N.Z. Oceanographic Institute. The Fisheries Research Division of the former Ministry of Agriculture and Fisheries joined NIWA in 1995.

NIWA was structured as a limited liability company under the Crown Research Institutes Act 1992

Most of NIWA's revenue was from contestable research funding and commercial consultancy work. As of 2014, NIWA had a revenue of $123.8 million and assets of $103.6 million.

On 26 September 2024, the Minister of Science, Innovation and Technology, Judith Collins, announced that NIWA would be acquiring the MetService.

On 14 May 2025, the Minister of Science, Innovation and Technology, Shane Reti, confirmed that NIWA would be integrated into a new Public Research Organisation called the New Zealand Institute for Earth Science.

=== Mission statement ===
"NIWA's mission is to conduct leading environmental science to enable the sustainable management of natural resources for New Zealand and the planet."

== Research ==
=== Research programmes ===
NIWA focused on atmospheric, marine, and freshwater research – extending from the deep ocean to the upper atmosphere – in New Zealand, the Pacific, Southern Ocean, and Antarctica.

NIWA's research spans diverse fields:

- aquaculture
- aquatic biodiversity
- aquatic biosecurity
- atmospheric science
- climate change
- coastal ecology
- renewable energy
- fisheries
- hydrology
- marine geology
- mātauranga Māori
- natural hazards (e.g. tsunami, storm surge, floods, earthquake, volcano)
- oceanography
- sedimentology

Research projects were undertaken in collaboration with local and central government agencies, other Crown Research Institutes, industry, private research companies, and universities in New Zealand and the rest of the world. In 2007–08, NIWA scientists were involved in more than 970 collaborations and NIWA had formal links with some 150 overseas institutions.

Within New Zealand, NIWA had close working relationships with many Māori entities (85 entities in 2007-08) through its Māori environmental research group, Te Kūwaha o Taihoro Nukurangi. NIWA set up the Te Kūwaha – Māori Environmental Research group to develop ways of sharing knowledge with Māori communities and empowering Māori business with the latest science. This is a critical part of science in Aotearoa New Zealand as institutes have been criticised for poor representation for Māori and Pasifika researchers. The team have had notable success with a taonga species guide and Māori specific climate impact research.

== People ==
Past and present staff include:

- Helen Bostock – oceanographer
- Helen ES Clark (Rotman) – zoologist
- Dennis Gordon – zoologist
- Janet Grieve – zoologist
- Barb Hayden – marine biologist
- Clive Howard-Williams – freshwater biologist
- Andrew Leachman – master mariner
- Dave Lowe – atmospheric scientist
- Brett Mullan – climate scientist
- Wendy Nelson – phycologist
- James Renwick – climate scientist
- Natalie Robinson – polar oceanographer
- Jim Salinger – climate scientist
- Simon Thrush – marine ecologist
- Dianne Tracey – deep-sea marine biologist
- David Wratt – climate scientist

=== Awards ===
In 2007, 12 NIWA climate scientists – Greg Bodeker, Matt Dunn, Rod Henderson, Darren King, Keith Lassey, Dave Lowe, Brett Mullan, Kath O'Shaughnessy, Guy Penny, James Renwick, Jim Salinger and David Wratt – shared the Nobel Peace Prize with other contributors to the Intergovernmental Panel on Climate Change.

== Research facilities ==
NIWA's research facilities included:

- A gas laboratory which uses gas chromatography and mass spectrometry to assess the composition of gases and their isotopes in samples of air and water, and isotope analysis of solid material.
- An ecotoxicology laboratory for assessing the effects of contaminants – such as heavy metals, pesticides, and wastes – on aquatic organisms.
- Aquaculture research facilities at Bream Bay in Northland and at Mahanga Bay, Wellington.
- An upper atmosphere research laboratory located at Lauder, Central Otago, New Zealand.
- Additionally, NIWA also operates (in conjunction with Antarctica New Zealand) a suite of atmospheric in situ and remote sensing instruments at Arrival Heights, Ross Island, Antarctica.

=== Lauder Atmospheric Research Laboratory ===
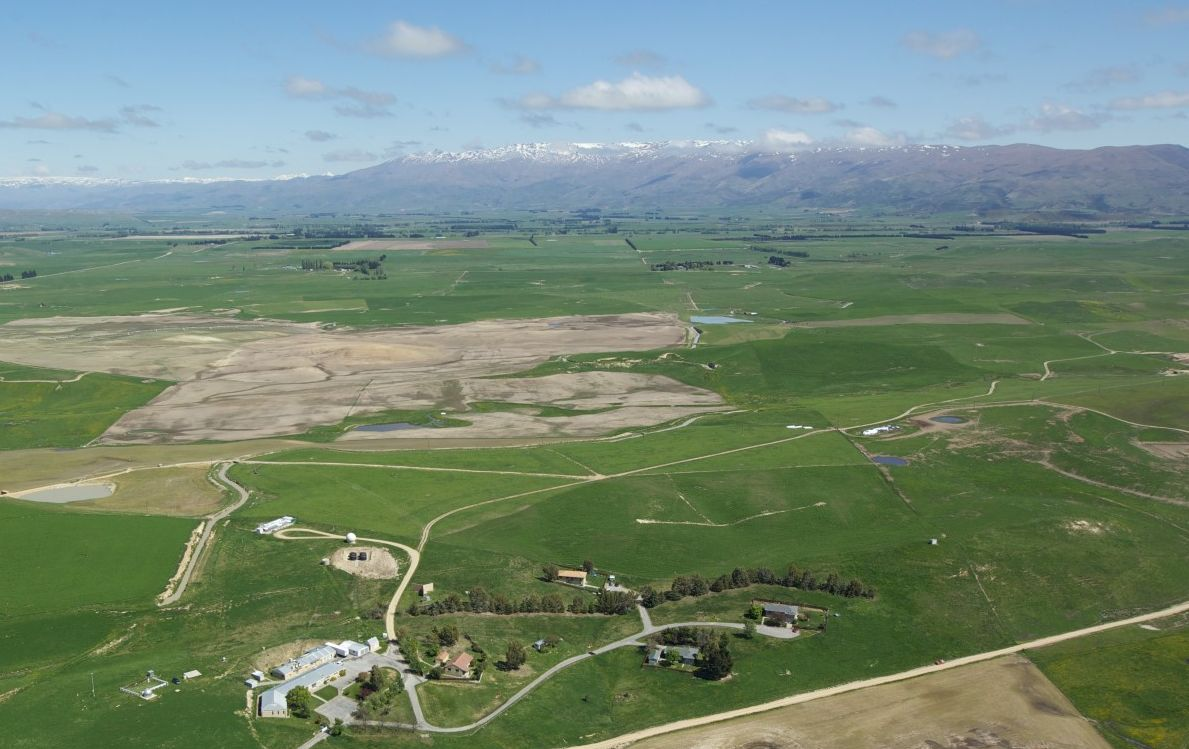
Lauder atmospheric research laboratory

The NIWA Lauder Atmospheric Research Laboratory took atmospheric measurements for the purpose of observing and better understanding interactions between the stratosphere, troposphere and global climate. This is achieved through measurements of ozone, solar radiation, aerosols and greenhouse gases. There are approximately 10 staff (scientists and technicians) working at the Laboratory (December 2015).

==== Location ====
Lauder is located 33 km north-east of Alexandra, in the South Island of New Zealand. It also hosts a telescope part of the BOOTES network. This location was chosen for the laboratory due to the area's low horizons, clear skies, dry atmosphere, and southern latitude location.

==== Research history ====
A research laboratory was originally established at Lauder in 1961 with the purpose of observing the aurora.

In the mid-70s Lauder was a ground tracking station for the satellite ensemble "International Satellites for Ionospheric Studies" (ISIS (satellite)). By the late 1970s research had shifted focus to the stratosphere. This shift was driven by the fear of ozone depletion due to manufactured gases, and by the fact that the ozone hole had been discovered. Lauder had begun measuring UV radiation, ozone, and other gases associated with ozone depletion. From the 1990s Lauder has also monitored the effects of ozone depletion on solar UV irradiance.

Recently, research at Lauder has focused on interactions between climate change and ozone depletion and Lauder now measures most gases that contribute to climate change. Computer models to predict future atmospheric changes have also been developed at Lauder, and the atmospheric measurements taken at Lauder are used in climate models around the world.

==== Measurements ====
Measurements of the atmosphere at Lauder can be carried out in situ, and through remote sensing. In situ measurements are mostly done at ground-level; however balloons are launched weekly and carry out in situ measurements through the atmosphere to altitudes of approximately 30 km. Data from these balloons enables atmospheric profiles of temperature, pressure, water vapour, and ozone to be produced. One method of remote sensing measurements at Lauder uses a LIDAR system to generate ozone profiles to 100 km in altitude. Another LIDAR measures aerosols in the atmosphere to 50 km in altitude. Other remote sensing at Lauder uses UV/Vis grating and FTIR spectrometers to measure trace gases in the atmosphere. Measurements at Lauder are also used to calibrate satellites such as OCO-2 and GOSAT.

==== Importance ====
The Lauder Atmospheric Research Laboratory is well known throughout the international world of atmospheric research through its participation in the international Network for the Detection of Atmospheric Composition Change (NDACC), BSRN, TCCON, and GCOS Reference Upper Air Network (GRUAN).

Lauder has many ongoing long-term measurements, including the longest time-series of nitrogen dioxide in the world.

The Laboratory is located in a data-sparse region of the globe. The oceans of the southern hemisphere and the Antarctic region play an important role in the global climate system and so measurements taken at Lauder are valuable to the global scientific community.

Solar radiation measurements at Lauder are used in studies on the effects of UV radiation on human health and in the solar energy and building industries

=== High Performance Computing Facility ===
In 2018 NIWA commissioned 3 powerful Cray supercomputers called Mahuika, Maui and Kupe, forming the HPCF (High Performance Computing Facility). The HPCF is capable of processing more than two thousand trillion calculations per second. 2 of the 3 Cray supercomputers (Mahuika and Maui) are located in NIWA's Wellington campus, while Kupe is located at the University of Tamaki Data Centre. It also leads investigations such as the analysis of genetic information, the modelling of the impact of climate change and forecasting weather related hazards. The detailed specifications of the HPCF can be found here.

=== NIWA Invertebrate Collection ===
The NIWA Invertebrate Collection (NIC) is the largest repository of marine invertebrate (animals without a backbone) specimens from the New Zealand region, southwestern Pacific, and the Ross Sea (Antarctica). It holds representatives of almost all phyla in the New Zealand region. Collected over the last 50 years and still growing, the collection holds several million specimens, ranging from single-celled organisms to giant corals. As of 2015, it included over 2100 type specimens of species new to science (800 holotypes and 1300 paratypes). The collection is used by scientists, teachers, and journalists throughout New Zealand and the world.

=== Natural Hazards Centre ===
In 2002 NIWA teamed up with the Institute of Geological and Nuclear Science to create the Natural Hazards Centre as a New Zealand resource for all hazards information and advice. The centre develops systems to monitor and predict the following hazards: earthquakes, tsunami, floods, storms, landslides, coastal flooding and waves, coastal erosion, and volcanoes.

== Research vessels ==
Foremost among NIWA's 30 vessels is the 70-metre deepwater research vessel RV Tangaroa, New Zealand's only ice-strengthened research ship. The 28-metre RV Kaharoa is used mainly for coastal research, but has gone further afield to deploy ocean-profiling Argo floats, from Chile to Mauritius. As a replacement for the Kaharoa, the RV Kaharoa II entered service in 2024.

NIWA research vessels
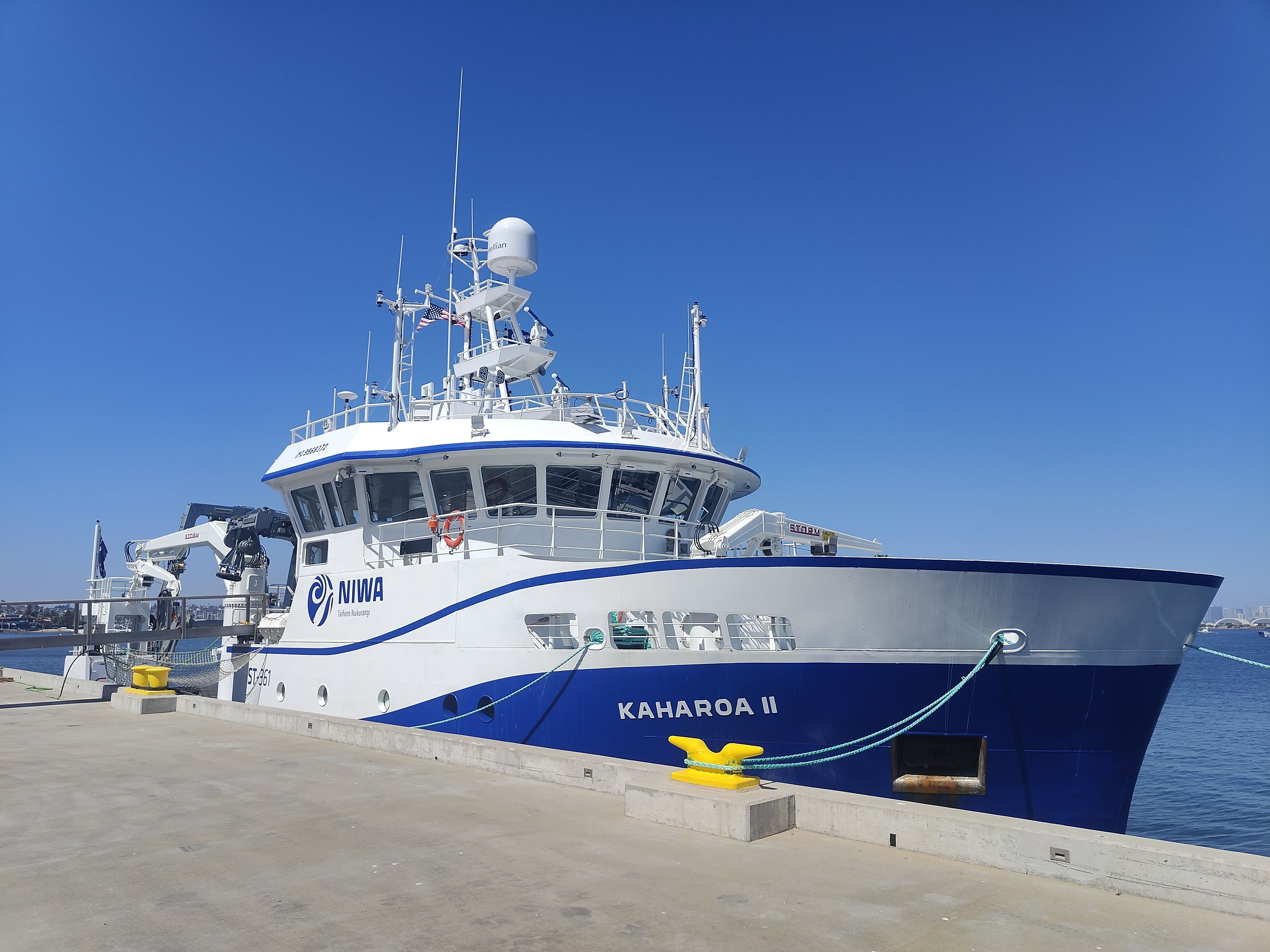
RV Kaharoa II

== Environmental monitoring ==
=== Monitoring Networks ===
NIWA maintains a range of monitoring networks that collect long-term environmental data, including climate information, sea level, river flows, water quality, and freshwater fish distributions and habitats.

As at 1 August 2008, NIWA had 1339 operational stations in its climate and water monitoring networks, spread throughout New Zealand, including the Chatham Islands. NIWA also holds data from more than 3000 closed stations, many of which have long usable records. The National Water Quality Network, for instance, has been operating at 77 sites since the 1970s. It can now show long-term trends in water quality.

=== Environmental data ===
NIWA maintains several databases containing long-term records of environmental data, and species records. The National Climate Database, for instance, contains more than 250 million individual measurements (as of August 2008), with records dating back to the 1850s. The New Zealand Freshwater Fish Database records the occurrence of fish in fresh waters of New Zealand, including major offshore islands, and details of their habitats. As of June 2009, the database included more than 28 000 records. Among other things, these databases are used to detect geographical and temporal trends in the state of the environment.

Atmospheric Carbon Dioxide Record from Baring Head, Wellington from 1977.

NIWA holds the longest continuous record of atmospheric CO_{2} concentrations in the Southern Hemisphere, measured at Baring Head, near Wellington, since the 1970s. Along with equivalent measurements from the Northern Hemisphere, taken at Mauna Loa Observatory in Hawaii, these records are used to model the effects of atmospheric CO_{2} on global climate. The history of this sampling record is described by Dave Lowe in the book "The Alarmist" which recounts his career.

The information in NIWA's databases is in high demand. In the 2007-08 financial year, for instance, NIWA responded to more than 350 000 requests for data from its databases. In July 2007, NIWA allowed free online access to archived data on climate, lake levels, river flow, sea levels, water quality, and freshwater fish.

=== Weather forecasting competition with MetService ===
NIWA and MetService are both government organizations that produce weather forecasts. NIWA was previously part of the MetService until 1992. In 2009, they signed a memorandum of understanding to work more closely together. In 2020, NIWA chief executive John Morgan told Parliament the two organizations are like "a car and a truck; both being vehicles but each serving different purposes". Private weather forecaster WeatherWatch commented that it is "bizarre" the government is funding two weather forecasters and compared it to "Fire Service getting into Police Speeding Infringements".

On 20 September 2024, the Minister for Science and Innovation, Judith Collins, announced that NIWA would be acquiring the Met Service. NIWA welcomed the merger announcement, stating that "it will be critical to ensure adequate capability is in place to maintain continuity of weather forecasting services, particularly during this transition..." It also said that it looked forward to legislation facilitating the takeover of MetService.

== Legal issues ==
=== Climate Court Action ===
New Zealand annual average land surface temperature anomaly from 1909 with a linear regression trend line. Source: NIWA.

From 2010 to 2012, NIWA defended itself in a court case claiming that they had exaggerated temperature increases. The charge was brought by the climate change deniers The New Zealand Climate Education Trust – a branch of the New Zealand Climate Science Coalition. They challenged NIWA figures which showed a rise in temperatures in New Zealand of 1 °C over the past 100 years. The climate denier group said the published increase of 1 °C was significantly higher than global warming figures around the world and almost 50 per cent above the global average. In a High Court judgement, Justice Geoffrey Venning ruled that the New Zealand Climate Science Education Trust had not been successful in any of the challenges they brought against NIWA. Justice Venning also decided that NIWA's cost should be paid by the trust and he said that if an agreement on the costs could not be reached he would make another ruling at a later stage.
