= Natalie Robinson =

Antarctic, climate and atmospheric researcher

- Education: BSc, MSc Victoria University of Wellington; PhD University of Otago
- Scientific career
- Fields: Polar Oceanography
- Workplaces: National Institute of Water and Atmospheric Research

Natalie Robinson is a New Zealand Antarctic researcher. She is based at the National Institute of Water and Atmospheric Research in New Zealand. She led the final two K131 Science Events on the sea ice of McMurdo Sound, Antarctica. In 2023, she was appointed Deputy Director of the N.Z. Antarctic Science Platform.

== Education ==
Robinson grew up in the Hawke's Bay Region and moved to Victoria University of Wellington to complete her MSc (2005) on tides beneath the McMurdo Ice Shelf with data collected during the ANDRILL project with Alex Pyne and Peter Barrett. She then completed her PhD (2012) at the University of Otago under the supervision of Pat Langhorne. She now works as a research scientist at National Institute of Water and Atmospheric Research.

== Career and impact ==
Robinson's work has significant contribution to understanding the oceanic connection between ice shelf and sea ice regimes. This has required direct sub-ice observations of pressure-induced supercooling; multi-phase fluid flow; roughness and drag at the interface; and buoyancy-driven convection. She focuses on the creation, evolution and fate of supercooled water, and its potential to influence sea ice growth.

Robinson has led a number of field expeditions to the sea ice of McMurdo Sound, Antarctica. She has been awarded prestigious Marsden grant funding twice - in 2015 and 2023. to study ice roughness beneath ice shelf affected sea ice. This resulted in two expeditions to McMurdo Sound. Her studies showed that new ice crystals could refreeze on the underside of sea ice and make the underside much rougher than under smooth melting ice.

This work used Antarctic infrastructure developed by Timothy Haskell. Robinson led the final expeditions using the "K131" Camp Haskell. The "K131" is an event designation assigned by Antarctica New Zealand.

She has worked with the artist Gabby O'Connor when O'Connor participated in Robinson's 2017 field expedition. This resulted in an exhibition at the Otago Museum in 2018. The lead-character in the play "Chilled: A Cool Story with a Warm Message" was based on Robinson.

In 2021 Robinson was named by Forbes Magazine to a panel of seven outstanding researchers in STEM. She has served as Treasurer on the Council of the New Zealand Association of Scientists.

In 2023 she was appointed Deputy Director of the N.Z. Antarctic Science Platform which is a long term research "platform" for Antarctic climate science.
