= RV Kaharoa II =

New Zealand research vessel

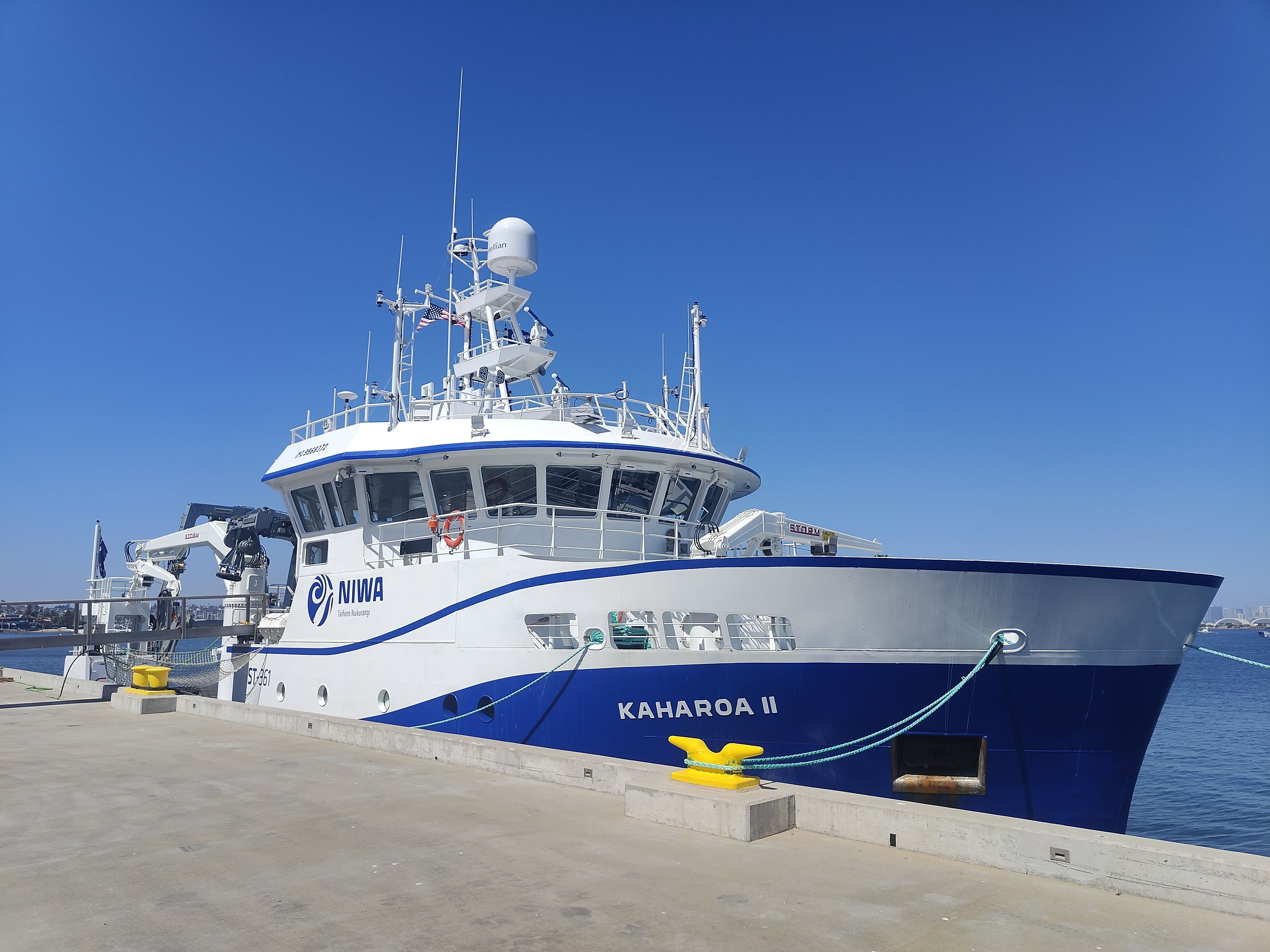
- RV Kaharoa II in San Diego in 2024.

History

New Zealand
- Owner: Earth Sciences New Zealand
- Builder: Astilleros ARMON, Vigo, Spain; Skipsteknisk (designers)
- Launched: 2023
- Home port: Wellington

General characteristics
- Class & type: DNV 1A, "Fishing vessel", DYNPOS-AUT, Silent A, Silent F, EO
- Tonnage: 499 tons
- Length: 36.1 m (118 ft 5 in)
- Beam: 9.5 m (31 ft 2 in)
- Draft: 3.65 m (12 ft 0 in)
- Propulsion: Yanmar Y6N21AW - 956kW @ 850 rpm. Tier III
- Speed: 10 knots (19 km/h; 12 mph) cruising, 12 knots (22 km/h; 14 mph) top speed
- Range: 6,500 nautical miles (12,000 km)
- Endurance: 30 days
- Crew: 6 mariners, 9 science party

RV Kaharoa II is a research vessel operated by Earth Sciences New Zealand (formerly NIWA). The contract for her construction was awarded to Astilleros Armon Vigo in Spain in 2022 as a replacement for the RV Kaharoa, put into service in 1981. She was launched in 2023 and entered service in 2024.

== Construction ==
Planning for the RV Kaharoa II took 6 years. It was scheduled for construction in March 2022 to replace the aging RV Kaharoa, which was 41 years old at the time. The ship was designed by Norwegian naval architecture firm Skipsteknisk, which also designed the RV Tangaroa. The Norwegian propulsion company Finnøy was contracted for the development of low-noise propulsion systems on the ship, classified as DNV Silent A-F.

Construction began in October 2022 and the keel was laid in January 2023. The ship was launched on August 30, 2023.

The ship passed through the Panama Canal and then stopped in San Diego, California in June 2024 en route to New Zealand. It arrived in New Zealand in August 2024, after 83 days of transit sailing from Spain.

=== Characteristics ===
The Kaharoa II was built with the intention of supporting the next 40 years of fisheries research in New Zealand, as well as taking over a number of scientific responsibilities from its predecessor. It is 8 meters longer than the Kaharoa, with additional deck space to continue the deployment of Argo floats. She cost $35 million.

Kaharoa II features 12.9 square metres (139 sq ft) of dry lab space, 12.6 square metres (136 sq ft) of wet lab space, a conference space, and accommodates nine science passengers in five cabins. The aft deck measures 85 square metres (910 sq ft). It features an A-frame and starboard T-frame for science operations, with two 2,000 metres (6,600 ft) trawl winches, a 6,500 metres (21,300 ft) CTD winch, and 4,000 metres (13,000 ft) oceanographic winch.

Acoustic equipment include a Kongsberg EM712 and EM2040, as well as an EK80 sounder. It uses a Seapath 380-R3 for its attitude reference system and a HiPAP 352 for hydro-acoustic positioning. It also has capability to install a Topas PS40 sub-bottom profiler.

== History ==
RV Kaharoa II was christened by Minister of Science, Innovation and Technology Judith Collins on 19 August 2024. Her maiden voyage was undertaken in for 3 weeks in the Hauraki Gulf, where she filmed underwater habitats.

In January 2025, it was announced that Kaharoa II would conduct sea trials from Nelson at the end of the month. The trials were designed to test conventional field applications of the Kaharoa, though with equipment of more modern materials. The Kaharoa completed its final voyage a few months later.
