= Senator Leach =

Senator Leach may refer to:

- Daylin Leach (born 1961), Pennsylvania State Senate
- Vince Leach (fl. 2010s), Arizona State Senate

== See also ==
- Robert E. Leachman (1806–1892), Mississippi State Senate
