= Gabby O'Connor =

Australian artist

Gabby O'Connor (born 1974, Melbourne, Victoria) is an Australian Installation Artist based in Wellington, New Zealand.

== Work ==
O'Connor's art practice involves production of site-specific works in paper, rope and light, as well as drawing and theatre-based collaboration. The works are typically large-scale and designed to fit into the location. Typically she works by transforming everyday materials into art. O’Connor often works collaboratively with partners ranging from scientists to community groups. Her works are designed to exist as installations in their own right, and also act as a bridge between art and science. A consequence is there is often an explicit educational component of the art production.

She has participated in two scientific expeditions to Antarctica where she produced art pieces in situ. The science was conducted by the K131 research team from National Institute of Water and Atmospheric Research and the University of Otago. The work was based out of Cape Haskell, a sea ice camp on the Sea ice of McMurdo Sound. This camp was designed and built by Tim Haskell and included a dedicated art laboratory built from an insulated Intermodal container.

Works from her 2015 expedition were subsequently displayed at Pataka Art + Museum in a 2016 exhibition titled Studio Antarctica. The second expedition resulted in an exhibition at the Otago Museum titled Data Days.

In 2018 she commenced a Ph.D. project (University of Auckland Faculty of Creative Arts and Industries that is part of the New Zealand Sustainable Seas National Science Challenge funded by the Ministry of Business, Innovation and Employment. This work marked a change in her focus from Antarctica to issues relating to sea level rise and involved development of rope-based sculpture. It resulted in "The Unseen" an exhibition at the Suter Gallery in Nelson.

== Education ==
O'Connor was awarded a Master of Fine Art degree from UNSW Art & Design in 2004. This followed a Certificate of Textile Design from RMIT School of Design TAFE (1998) and a Bachelor of Fine Arts from the Victorian College of the Arts at the University of Melbourne (1996).

== Exhibitions ==
O'Connor has exhibited since 1998, in New Zealand, Australia and internationally.

- 2023 All the Colours, All the Light, Ashburton Art Gallery, NZ
- 2021 SOLO 2021, Dowse Art Museum, Lower Hutt, NZ
- 2021 The Unseen, Tauranga Art Gallery, NZ
- 2018 The Unseen, The Suter Gallery, Nelson, NZ
- 2017 All the Colours, All the Light, Sharjah Art Museum Islamic Arts Festival 2017
- 2017 Data Days and Studio Antarctica, Otago Museum, Dunedin, NZ
- 2016 StudioAntarctica, Pataka Gallery Porirua, NZ
- 2014 Inland Ice, NZ IceFest, Christchurch, NZ
- 2014 Heavy Water, Expressions Gallery, Upper Hutt, NZ
- 2013 Order, Structure, Pattern, Toi Poneke, Wellington, NZ
- 2013 Cleave, Urban Dream Brokerage, Wellington
- 2013 Some Time, Corban Estate Arts Centre, Auckland, NZ
- 2011 What Lies Beneath, City Gallery, Wellington, NZ
- 2011 Waiwera House, Auckland, NZ
- 2011 What Lies Beneath – The Return, North Wall, Oxford, UK
- 2011 Above, Below, Mahara Gallery, Waikanae, NZ
- 2008 Cracks In The Stack, Toi Poneke Roof Top Installation, Wellington, NZ
- 2007 The Rock Show, Toi Poneke, Wellington, NZ
- 2005 Snowcave, Wellington Art Centre Gallery, NZ
- 2003 Chasing Horizons, Firstdraft Gallery, Sydney, Australia
- 2001 Passage [From A-B], Enjoy Public Art Gallery, Wellington, NZ
- 2001 Horizonworks, Marsden Art House, Wellington, NZ
- 2000 Water|Tent, First Floor Artists/Writers Space, Melbourne, Australia
- 2000 Water|Moving, Hiroshima Art Project, Residency/Installation, Japan
- 1999 Water|Barriers Studio12 Installation, 200 Gertrude Street Gallery, Melbourne, Australia
- 1998 Water|Blanket, Discrete Project Installation at Arts Victoria, Melbourne, Australia

== Collections ==
O'Connor’s work is held in private and public art collections including the Dowse Art Museum, Samuel Marsden Collegiate School and the Museum Art Hotel.
