= David Wratt =

New Zealand climate scientist (born 1949)

David Wratt QSO CRSNZ
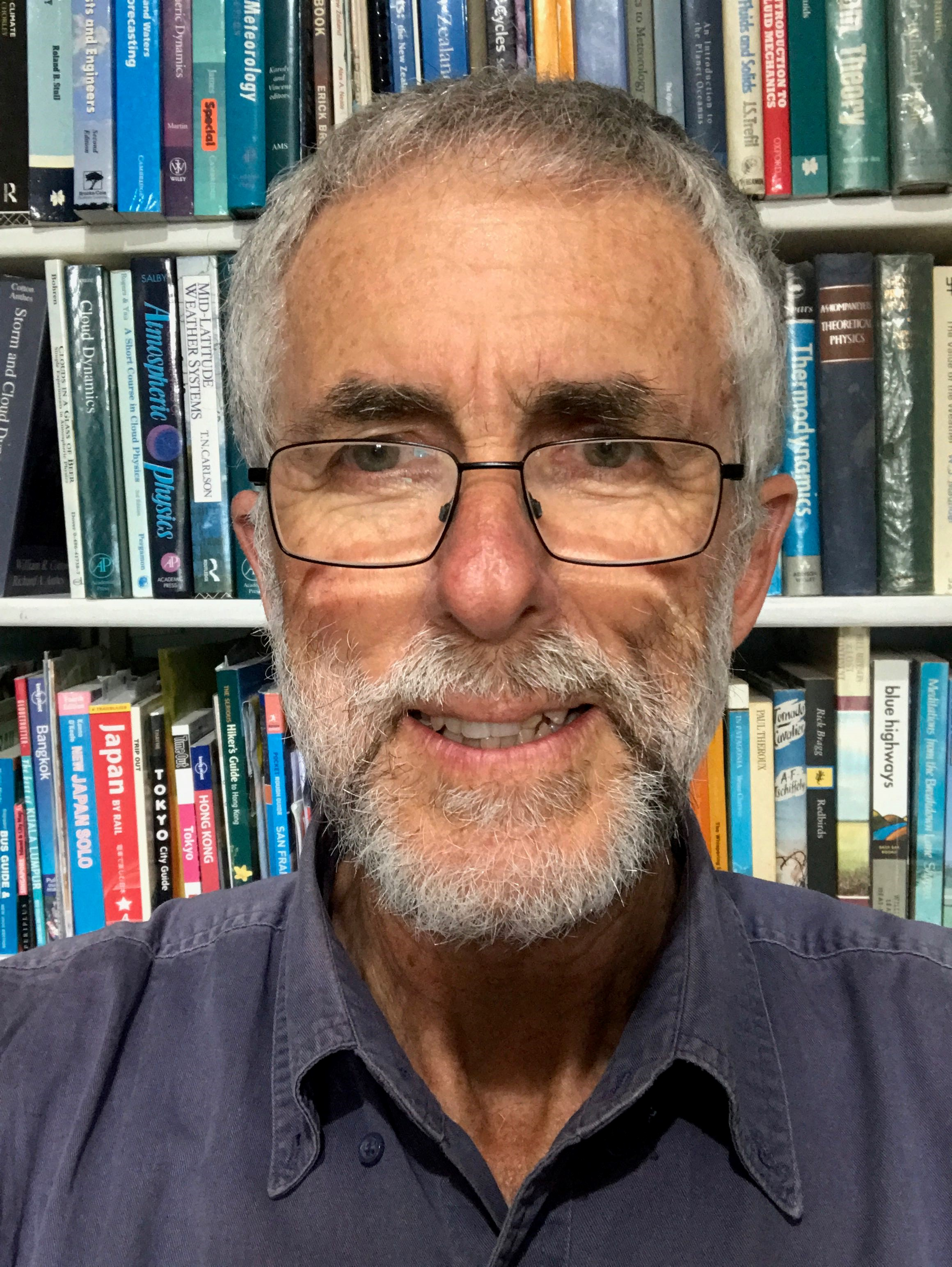
- Born: 1949 (age 76–77)
- Education: University of Canterbury
- Scientific career
- Fields: Climate science
- Workplaces: Meteorological Service of New Zealand; National Institute of Water and Atmospheric Research
- Thesis: Atmospheric physics: electron density variations in the mesosphere (1974)
- Doctoral advisor: Grahame Fraser

David Stuart Wratt QSO CRSNZ (born 1949) is a New Zealand climate scientist who specialises in meteorology and the science and impact of climate change. He is an adjunct research fellow at the New Zealand Climate Change Research Institute at Victoria University of Wellington, and has had many roles at the National Institute of Water and Atmospheric Research (NIWA), including six years as chief scientist (climate). His current position at NIWA is emeritus scientist (climate). Wratt is a Companion of the Royal Society of New Zealand and was the chair of the society's New Zealand Climate Committee. He has had advisory roles for the New Zealand Government, including science advisor at the Ministry for the Environment, and is currently a member of the Science Board for the Ministry of Business, Innovation and Employment. He has had input into assessments by the Intergovernmental Panel on Climate Change (IPCC), notably, contributing to its award of the 2007 Nobel Peace Prize through his contributions to the IPCC Fourth Assessment Report. Wratt has worked in the United States and Australia as well as New Zealand.

== Education and early life ==
Wratt was raised on a farm in Motueka and realised at a young age that he was good at maths and science so went to the University of Canterbury where he graduated with a Bachelor of Science with first-class honours in physics, and stayed to complete a PhD in atmospheric science. The title of his doctoral thesis, supervised by Grahame Fraser and submitted in 1974, was Atmospheric physics: electron density variations in the mesosphere. He recalls that "by the time I'd followed this theme through a post-doc at the University of Illinois in the States, I was ready for a change and came back to New Zealand to work for the Meteorological Service at Kelburn in Wellington."

== Career ==
=== New Zealand Meteorological Service ===
Wratt was a research and consultant meteorologist with the New Zealand Meteorological Service (1976–1982), later becoming superintendent, Boundary Layer Meteorology Group with the organisation (1982–1987). When he began working at the Meteorological Service, Wratt had intended to train as a weather forecaster but instead did fieldwork to provide information to minimise problems of air quality from the big industries that were planned under a programme at the time in New Zealand called Think Big. The focus of this work was to build an understanding of pollutant emissions from factories and power stations and how they might impact local environments. He had a range of other roles in the Meteorological Service until 1992 when he and other climate researchers transferred to NIWA. At this point in his career, Wratt became more involved with the science of climate change.

=== National Institute of Water and Atmospheric Research ===
In 2007 he became NIWA's general manager of climate change, noted by Wratt as a position established to coordinate research from "many disciplines – hazards, floods, aquaculture, water quality in rivers...[to get]... oversight of all these fields to understand what's driving change, what is vulnerable, and how to increase resilience." The aim was to work collaboratively with Crown Research Institutes (CRIs) and universities to develop of "tools and science-based policies for reducing greenhouse gas emissions and adapting to climate change." From November 2007 to September 2014, he was the chief scientist, climate, for NIWA and from September 2014 has been emeritus scientist, climate, for the organisation.

When asked in 2007 what he thought was the most important "take-home message" about climate change, Wratt said:

“Climate has always changed. What's different now is that humans are causing some of the changes through burning fossil fuels. If we continue down this track, we're going to see major problems around the world. There's a strong scientific case for significantly reducing greenhouse gas emissions. We need a combination of reducing our emissions in New Zealand and being part of international negotiations to reduce emissions globally in order to forestall the worst effects.”

=== Advisory roles ===
On 20 May 2015, Wratt was appointed as departmental science advisor to the Ministry for the Environment (New Zealand). In announcing the appointment, Nick Smith, the Minister for the Environment, clarified that Wratt's role was to provide advice directly to the Secretary for the Environment, so that high-quality science was used by the Ministry, and to support "cross-government science policy and research initiatives such as the National Science Challenges." Wratt also became a member of The Science Board, a statutory body associated with the Ministry of Business, Innovation & Employment which makes investment decisions for the Endeavour Fund and National Science Challenges. In 2015 he became chair of the Independent Science Panel for the MBIE-funded Deep South National Science Challenge (Te Kōmata o Te Tonga), which has the mission of enabling New Zealanders to adapt, manage risk and thrive in a changing climate. He also became the deputy chair of the Science Advisory Panel for Our Land and Water (Toitu te Whenua, Toiora te Wai), which had the aim of enhancing "the production and productivity of the primary sector while maintaining and improving our land and water quality for current and future users."

=== The Royal Society of New Zealand ===
He is a Companion of the Royal Society of New Zealand and from April to May 2015 served on an expert advice panel established by the society to "provide a clear summary of the scientific evidence and projections of climate change and to identify key risks these changes pose to New Zealand, including as a result of wider societal changes and environmental pressures."

=== The Intergovernmental Panel on Climate Change (IPCC) ===
Wratt has been involved with the IPCC since 1990 and was a coordinating lead author of the "Australia and New Zealand" chapter of the IPCC Third Assessment Report (2001). He has served on the panel's 30-strong Bureau (the steering committee), and from 2002 to 2015 was a vice-chair of Working Group 1, which is concerned with the science of past, present, and future climate change and assesses the physical science of climate change.

=== Academic positions ===
- 2009–2018 Adjunct professor, New Zealand Climate Change Research Institute, Victoria University of Wellington
- 2012–2015 Adjunct professor, International Institute of Agri-Food Security, Curtin University, Perth, Australia
- 1997 Visiting scientist, CSIRO Division of Atmospheric Research, Melbourne
- 1986–98 Honorary lecturer, Institute of Geophysics, Victoria University, Wellington
- 1986 Visiting scientist, Atmospheric Science Research Laboratory, US Environmental Protection Agency (Fulbright Travel Award)
- 1975 Visiting research associate, University of Illinois

== Controversies ==
In 2003, Chris de Freitas, then of Auckland University, questioned anthropogenic global warming, and the way statistics about this were received and interpreted. He claimed that carbon dioxide emissions were reducing and therefore were not necessarily the source of recent increases in global temperature. Wratt, along with Dave Lowe and Brett Mullin responded to de Freitas with data that showed the rise in worldwide temperatures was real and this could be largely attributed to human activity. In 2006, de Freitas again challenged the way statistics on climate change were being interpreted and continued to hold that research was suggesting that extreme climate events may become less frequent and severe, and in 2013 claimed that the "global warming issue is as emotionally charged as it is misunderstood" and the models that were being used to make global-warming predictions were not distinguishing between anthropogenic and natural causes. When de Freitas, Dedekind and Brill in 2015 published a paper that questioned the reliability of previous analyses of regional long-term data used to detect trends in global climate change, focussing particularly on New Zealand, Wratt, along with other scientists Mullan, Jim Salinger and James Renwick published Comment on A Reanalysis of Long-Term Surface Air Temperature Trends in New Zealand (2018). In this paper they identified what they considered were "methodological flaws" in the document by de Freitas (et al.) and listed several lines of evidence pointing to an increase of 0.7 to 1.0 °C per century for New Zealand temperatures. Wratt and his colleagues argued that the increase of temperatures of New Zealand land surfaces for the period 1909-2009 claimed by de Freitas et al. were too low. They disagreed with de Freitas et al.'s claim that processes used previously for analysing data from the "seven-station series" (7SS) were incorrect. They concluded "there is no reason to reject the previous estimates of around 0.9 °C warming per century".

On July 5, 2010, The New Zealand Climate Science Education Trust (NZCSET), associated with the New Zealand Climate Science Coalition, unsuccessfully sought a judicial review of climate data published by National Institute of Water and Atmospheric Research (NIWA) claiming that the organisation had employed the wrong methodology to adjust historic temperature readings based on this data. The case was dismissed, with the judgement concluding that the "plaintiff does not succeed on any of its challenges to the three decisions of NIWA in the issue. In the New Zealand Herald, Wratt said that the judgement was clear and that "while it is important for scientists to have an open mind, the research and data from around the world showed the big picture, which is that the climate has warmed and this is very likely due to increases in greenhouse gases."

== Selected research ==
=== The influence of mountains on weather ===
Early in his career with NIWA, Wratt had a lead role in a programme called The Southern Alps Experiments (SALPEX). The findings of this programme, that explored how the Alps influence New Zealand's weather and the climate were later published in a journal article co-authored by Wratt. The study used rain gauge and radar observations to show how precipation varied across the Alps during a northwesterly storm in 1994 and concluded that this information was critical to accurate forecasting of floods. Wratt later recalled that for their fieldwork, they used the "Australian CSIRO's instrumented plane – a Fokker Friendship – to measure droplet size and winds." Wratt was involved in further research in the Southern Alps in 2000 that confirmed the importance of hydrologists and weather forecasters understanding how New Zealand's mountains influence weather and so improve predictive modelling of rainfall and river flows.

Wratt took part in a study in 1999 that looked at diurnal wind variation on the side of mountain ranges in New Zealand and Japan and how it affected surrounding areas such as the Canterbury Plains and the Kanto Plain. The study showed the importance of understanding how diurnal surface heating affected the behaviour of the winds in the lee convergence zone (LCZ), a region or line downwind of a mountain where winds interact and result in distinctive weather conditions.

=== Scenarios to inform responses to emissions ===
Wratt participated in research in 2001 that aimed to predict how anthropogenic greenhouse gas and aerosol emissions would influence the climate. The researchers used scenarios of some greenhouse emissions pathways for the future based on social, economic and technological developments at the time. Using scientific understanding, projections were made for greenhouse gas concentrations and the resulting climate changes in each of the scenarios. These climate predictions provided estimations about the vulnerability of environmental, economic and social systems and their ability to respond and adapt for periods of 50 years from 1970 to 2099. The models predicted an increase in temperature in the Southern Hemisphere that was slightly less than the whole globe and that precipitation and westerly winds would become more intense across New Zealand.

In 2010 Wratt co-editored Climate Change Adaption in New Zealand Future scenarios and some sectoral perspectives, a collection of papers based on presentations made at 'Climate Change Adaptation – Managing the Unavoidable', a conference held in Wellington, New Zealand in May 2009, and which presented perspectives from different sectors on adaption to climate change. Wratt co-authored the second paper, Global & local climate change scenarios to support adaptation in New Zealand, which presented two scenarios of global and local climate changes and explored how these assist in measuring the impact of, and adaption to climate change in New Zealand. The first scenario represented a "'high carbon world', with global average temperatures reaching almost 4°C above pre-industrial by 2100...[and the second represented]...a 'rapidly decarbonising world' with global temperature increase by 2100 limited to 2°C above pre-industrial." The introduction to the paper stated that climate change in the future depended on the degree of greenhouse gas and aerosol concentrations in the atmosphere and how these were responded to - specifically identifying and managing socio-economic developments that contributed to these levels. The authors concluded that the 'high carbon world' would be likely to have significant impacts of climate change globally, while these impacts would be lessened in a world that was "rapidly decarbonising."

== Selected publications ==
IPCC Expert Meeting on the Future of the Task Group on Data and Scenario Support for Impacts and Climate Analysis (2016). Wratt was co-editor of this report and Steering Committee Co-chair of The IPCC Task Group on Data and Scenario Support for Impact and Climate Analysis (TGICA) that had a mandate "to facilitate wide availability of climate-change-related data and scenarios to enable research and sharing of information across the three IPCC Working Groups." The document is a report of a meeting of TGICA, held on 26 and 27 January 2016 and involving international experts. The report recommended a strengthening of the role of TGICA and upgrading the Data Distribution Centre (DDC) by establishing an improved dataset index that would gather information effectively through accurate recording of primary sources, appropriate citations and keywords.

The Role of Local Government in Adapting to Climate Change: Lessons from New Zealand (2011). Wratt co-authored this chapter in the book series Advances in Global Change Research. The chapter noted the importance of local government in facilitating adaptation to climate change at local and regional levels and suggested New Zealand had a model that enabled this process, specifically by raising community awareness, utilising the expertise of professionals, systematically assessing risks and identifying vulnerabilities in an area, and getting support from central government. The chapter showed the detail of how this was done and discussed any barriers and uncertainties that needed to be addressed.

An initial assessment of the potential effects of climate change on New Zealand agriculture (2008). Co-authored by Wratt, this paper examined the economic implications of climate change to agricultural production in New Zealand and summarised the knowledge at the time to predict the likely costs and benefits of adaption. The work, based on earlier climate change scenarios, described the methods for calculating the impact of these changes on pasture production and noted the expected changes in productivity for pastoral agriculture land uses in New Zealand over time. The article recommended farmers should consider some of the predictions about temperature increases impacting the drying and growth of pastures and make changes as necessary to maintain production.

Climate Change 2007: The Physical Science Basis. Technical Summary (2007). Accepted by the Intergovernmental Panel on Climate Change, 1 Feb 2007. Wratt was a Lead Author for this document which presented an overview of scientific information on the complexities of climate change based on the peer-reviewed literature available in mid-2006. The findings of the document supported the IPCC Working Group 1 assessments which were part of the Summary for Policymakers and focussed on natural and anthropogenic drivers of climate change, how changes in the climate system are related to the physical process and provided an "overview of explanations of observed climate changes based on climate models and physical understanding, the extent to which climate change can be attributed to specific causes and a new evaluation of climate sensitivity to greenhouse gas increases." It acknowledged that "robust findings" needed to be examined if "key uncertainties" about how climate change science were to be addressed.

Climate for crops: integrating climate data with information about soils and crop requirements to reduce risks in agricultural decision-making (2006). This article looked at the different ways that the impact of temperate climatic factors were estimated and mapped in New Zealand to inform land-use decisions about the best crops to grow in an area. The authors noted that this information also provided useful advice to farmers about water requirements for irrigation or managing the risk of frost. It was further stated that knowledge of the technique used in mapping, could "reduce the risk that farmers will try to grow a new crop in an area where the climate or soil is unsuitable."

New Zealand climate change - Water and adaptation (2006). Co-authored by Wratt, this is a chapter in Confronting Climate Change - Critical Issues for New Zealand.

Climate Change Effects and Impacts Assessment. A guidance manual for Local Government in New Zealand. (2004) A manual to support local government in New Zealand in making informed decisions about the implication of climate change in their regions, [noting that] "natural fluctuations and human-induced climate changes need to be considered when developing adaptation plans and policies, rather than just 'greenhouse warming' effects on their own...[involving]... iterative planning processes, keeping up-to-date with new information, monitoring changes, and reviewing the effectiveness of responses."

== Awards and honours ==
Wratt was honoured as a Companion of the Royal Society of New Zealand (CRSNZ) in 2000, as recognition for his contributions to promoting and advancing science.

In 2007, Wratt was one of several New Zealand scientists who contributed toward the IPCC Fourth Assessment Report by the Intergovernmental Panel on Climate Change (IPCC), set up to provide an authoritative international statement of scientific understanding of climate change. As a result of this work, the Nobel Peace Prize 2007 was awarded jointly to the IPCC and Al Gore. As a contributor to the Report, Wratt co-authored The Summary for Policy-Makers and The Technical Summary, and was Review Editor for both The Observations: Oceanic Climate Change and Sea Level and The Synthesis Report.

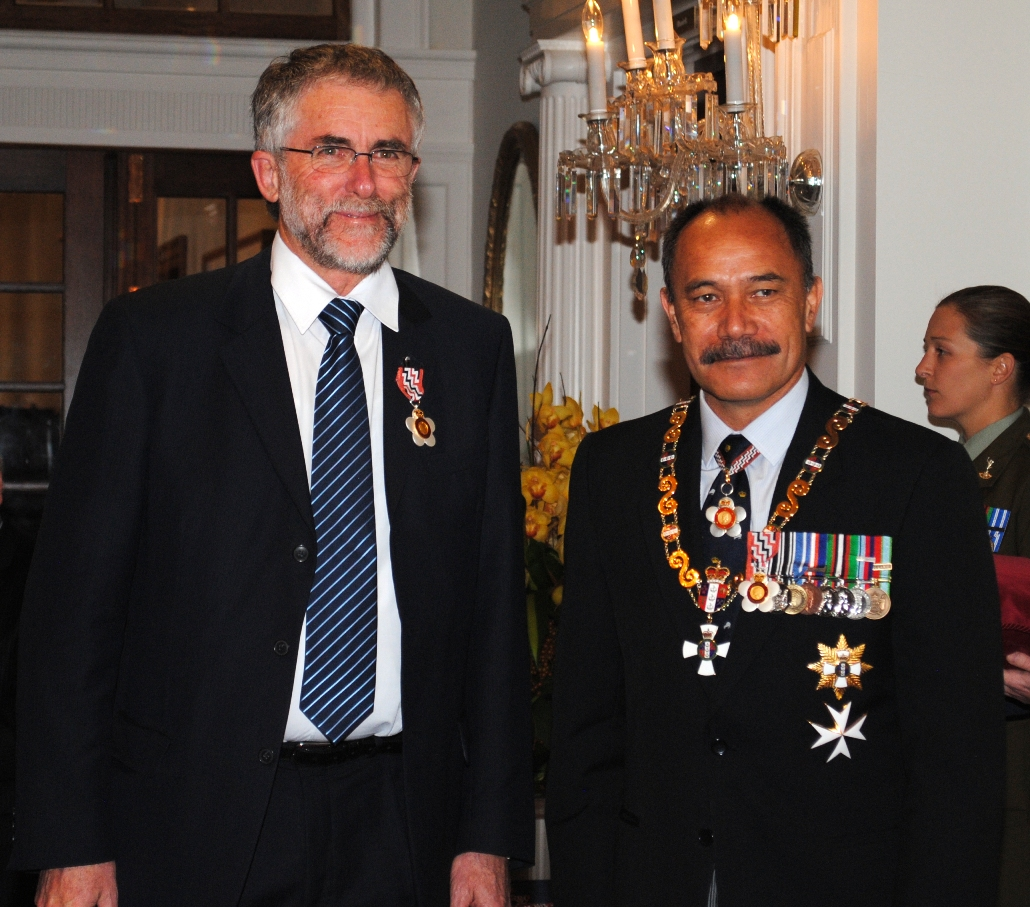
Wratt (left), after his investiture as a Companion of the Queen's Service Order by the governor-general, Sir Jerry Mateparae, in 2012

Wratt was appointed a Companion of the Queen's Service Order in the 2012 New Year Honours, for services to science. Writing in the New Zealand newspaper Stuff, Andrea O'Neil noted:

"You won't find a more modest award recipient than Tawa climate change scientist Dr David Wratt. He is quick to point out he owes much to his colleagues for the honours he has received, from being on the panel which won the 2007 Nobel Peace Prize to being admitted as a companion of the Queen's Service Order at New Year, the highest honour a local person has received this year."

In 2013, Wratt was awarded the NIWA Excellence Award – Science Communication, for his outstanding leadership in communicating climate and climate change science.
