= GRV James Cook =

Research vessel of the New Zealand Ministry of Agriculture and Fisheries

History

New Zealand
- Name: James Cook
- Namesake: James Cook
- Owner: Ministry of Agriculture and Fisheries
- Operator: MAF Fisheries
- Builder: Akers MV, Trondheim, Norway
- Launched: 17 Aug 1966
- Acquired: 1969
- Out of service: 1991
- Homeport: Wellington
- Identification: IMO number: 6618366
- Fate: Scuttled in December 2007

General characteristics
- Displacement: 499 GT
- Length: 42.67 m (140.0 ft)

GRV James Cook was a research vessel of the New Zealand Ministry of Agriculture and Fisheries. It was built in 1966 as the New Zealand Sea Products Export Ltd trawler Sea Harvester II and purchased by the New Zealand government in 1969 when the company went bankrupt. The ship was renamed James Cook after Captain James Cook and used as a research vessel until 1991, when it was replaced by the RV Tangaroa. From 1973 to 1991 Andrew Leachman served as first mate and then captain; he went on to captain the Tangaroa for over 20 years.

James Cook was purchased by Seafresh New Zealand Ltd for use as a fishing boat but the company ceased trading soon after. The ship was in poor condition and made its last voyage under power from Nelson to Wellington in 1997. It was purchased by James Cook Shipping for use as a charter boat in Fiji. It was stripped of most of its equipment in July 2004. It suffered damage after breaking free from its moorings in October 1998 and again in August 2007. It was also set on fire by vandals several times. The hulk was scuttled in the former explosives dumping ground about 15 nautical miles (28 km) southwest of Cape Palliser on 2 December 2007.
