= Leechman =

Leechman is a surname. Notable people with the surname include:

- James Leechman, Lord Leechman (1906–1986), Scottish advocate and judge
- John Leechman (1803–1874), Scottish missionary
- William Leechman (1706–1785), Scottish minister, theologian, and academic

== See also ==
- Leachman, surname
