= RV Kaharoa =

New Zealand research vessel

History

New Zealand
- Owner: Kaharoa Marine Services
- Launched: 1981
- Home port: Dunedin

General characteristics
- Type: Survey ship
- Displacement: 300 tonnes
- Length: 28.0 m (91 ft 10 in)
- Beam: 8.2 m (26 ft 11 in)
- Draft: 3.2 m (10 ft 6 in)
- Speed: 10.5 knots (19.4 km/h; 12.1 mph)

RV Kaharoa is a research vessel previously operated by the National Institute of Water and Atmospheric Research (NIWA) of New Zealand. Launched in 1981, the vessel has undertaken a wide range of surveys, data from which has led to the discovery of several new species, such as a new species of eelpout, five new species of Fissuroderes and a new species of copepod in the genus Bradyidius. The ship has played a "key role" in the International Argo Project. Kaharoa's replacement vessel, RV Kaharoa II, was delivered in 2024. Kaharoa is now operated by Kaharoa Marine Services

== History ==
Launched in 1981, the ship is 28 metres (91 ft 10 in) long, with a 3.2-metre (10 ft) draft. It has a cruising speed of 10.5 knots (19.4 km/h; 12.1 mph). RV Kaharoa is scheduled to be replaced by RV Kaharoa II in 2024. It is 8 metres (26 ft 3 in) longer than the Kaharoa and has increased capacity for staff, as well as laboratory and desk-based research. Within NIWA, the ship was nicknamed 'The Little Ship That Can', due its size and performance. By early 2020 it was decided a vessel to replace Kaharoa was required due to the vessel reaching the end of its operational life. Her replacement, Kaharoa II arrived in New Zealand mid-2024 to continue the marine research undertaken by Kaharoa over the previous 40 years.

== Research ==
=== Scientific discoveries ===
Autonomous landers, Observing the deepest places on Earth from RV Kaharoa

As a research vessel, it has been involved in a number of scientific discoveries. In 2012 the University of Aberdeen's OceanLab expedition found 'supergiant amphipods' up to 34 centimetres (13 in) long in the Kermadec Trench, identified as the species Alicella gigantea. In 2013 a further iteration of the OceanLab project using the Kaharoa led to the discovery of a new species of eelpout, as well as new depth records for species of deep sea cusk eel and rattail. RV Kaharoa also contributed to the discovery of five new species of Fissuroderes, found off the coast of Costa Rica and the Firth of Thames. Another example of the ship's role in scientific discovery is that of a new species of copepod in the genus Bradyidius.

=== Fisheries surveys ===
The ship has also undertaken a wide range of fisheries surveys. Some examples include: assessment of juvenile snapper, 2019–21; species in the Hauraki Gulf with RV Ikatere; amongst others. The ship was also used to survey the sea floor to measure and analyse the impact that Cyclone Gabrielle had on it in 2023.

=== Argo float project ===
The ship is part of the International Argo Project, a float deployment scheme focussed on climate and oceanic data, as well as the Global Drifter Program. The ship has deployed Argo floats since 2014, concentrating on getting the floats to areas with low maritime traffic in the Southern Hemisphere, sailing 79,996 nautical miles as part of the project. In 2020, during the COVID-19 pandemic, the crew of the Kaharoa undertook their longest voyage to date, to continue to support the deployment of Argo floats – work that had been delayed due to lockdown restrictions globally. The ship has played a "key role in the global deployment ... of the Argo array".

As of 2024, NIWA estimates Kaharoa to have deployed about a quarter of all Argo floats.
