= MetService =

Meteorological service of New Zealand

Meteorological Service of New Zealand
- Te Ratonga Tirorangi (Māori)
- Logo of MetService

Crown entity overview
- Formed: 1 July 1992 (34 years ago)
- Preceding Crown entity: New Zealand Meteorological Service
- Jurisdiction: New Zealand
- Headquarters: Wellington, New Zealand
- Employees: 304
- Crown entity executives: Martin Matthews, Board Chair; Rob Harrison, Acting Chief Executive
- Website: metservice.com

Meteorological Service of New Zealand Limited, doing business as MetService (Māori: Te Ratonga Tirorangi, lit. 'sky-looking service'), is the national meteorological service of New Zealand. MetService was established as a state-owned enterprise in 1992. It employs about 300 staff, and its headquarters are in Wellington, New Zealand. Prior to becoming a state-owned enterprise, New Zealand's national meteorological service has existed in a number of forms since the appointment of the country's first Director of Meteorological Stations in August 1861.

As New Zealand's national meteorological service, MetService produces and issues forecasts and official weather warnings on behalf of New Zealand's Ministry of Transport and is certified by the Civil Aviation Authority of New Zealand.

International media, aviation and energy business is conducted under the MetraWeather brand.

MetService has been certified to the ISO 9001 standard since November 1995. From 1 July 2025 MetService will become a subsidiary of NIWA, which will be part of the new New Zealand Institute for Earth Science.

== History ==
The weather forecasting service began in 1861, when a spate of shipwrecks prompted the Government to start a storm warning service as part of the then Marine Department.

Forecasting remained a marine service until 1926, when it became part of the newly formed Department of Scientific and Industrial Research. In 1927 Edward Kidson was appointed Dominion Meteorologist by Earnest Marsden. At the time the New Zealand Meteorological Service was a very small institution with a staff of five and a complete lack of useful long-period meteorological records.

At the outbreak of World War Two in 1939, forecasting became part of the Royal New Zealand Air Force. The focus on aviation continued with a move in 1964 to the then Department of Civil Aviation, which in 1968 became part of a new "super ministry", the Ministry of Transport.

During the 1980s there was increasing pressure on government funding for meteorology in New Zealand, together with a government-wide move to "user-pays" for specialised services, and to more autonomy and accountability for government departments. A combination of commercial competition in the deregulated market for meteorological services and reform of publicly funded science led to the establishment of MetService as a state-owned enterprise on 1 July 1992.

In 2013, MetService invested in a 49% shareholding in MetOcean Solutions Limited, a New Zealand oceanographic services company. MetOcean was an established company specialising in oceanographic analysis for research and forecasting for many purposes, including ports, offshore oil & gas industries and surfers.

In early September 2020, MetService's website came under a wave of distributed denial of service attacks that also targeted the New Zealand Exchange, Stuff, Radio New Zealand and Westpac bank.

=== Relationship with NIWA ===
In 1992, the National Institute of Water and Atmospheric Research (NIWA) was spun off from the MetService to become a separate Crown entity focusing on long-term weather patterns and climate change. Following the separation of the two organisations, MetService remained the official weather forecasting authority. Over the next 32 years, the two entities clashed over access to books in the old MetService library and the accuracy of their weather reports. In January 2007, the New Zealand Government brought a mediator to repair relations between the MetService and NIWA. In 2009, the two organisations signed a memorandum of understanding to work more closely together. However, the two organisations continued to clash over the accuracy of their weather reports.

In 2020, MetService chief executive Peter Lennox told Parliament that they have more weather models and meteorologists and produced more detailed forecast than NIWA. In 2022, MetService objected to the Department of Conservation's purchase of NIWA's forecasts for use in its parks, claiming it was "inappropriate for public service" due to its reliance on automated forecasts without intervention from professional meteorologists. MetService has a contract with the Ministry of Transport to provide weather forecasts.

Following several extreme weather events in 2023, the Government commissioned the Sapere research group to explore how the two meteorological services could combine their capabilities. In late September 2024, Science, Innovation and Technology Minister, Judith Collins announced that NIWA would be acquiring MetService in order to streamline weather forecasting services and give easier access to weather information from one source. Metservice issued a statement welcoming the merger, stating "we see this as an opportunity to have a more connected weather forecasting system that allows a better integration between climate science, forecasting, hydrology, and coastal hazards."

=== Earth Sciences New Zealand ===
On 14 May 2024, Minister of Science, Innovation and Technology Shane Reti announced that the MetService and NIWA would be integrated into a new Public Research Organisation called the New Zealand Institute for Earth Science. However, this requires the passage of the Meteorological Services (Acquisition and Policies) Legislation Amendment Bill, which as at the dissolution of Parliament on 1 October 2026 had not yet occurred.

== Overview ==
=== World Meteorological Organization ===
The world's national meteorological and hydrological services work with the World Meteorological Organization (WMO), a specialised agency of the United Nations. As part of the WMO World Weather Watch, MetService sends observational data gathered from the New Zealand region to other WMO member countries around the world. This is used as input to computer models of the weather at the world's major numerical weather prediction centres.

MetService operates a data collection network within New Zealand. It complies with recognised international standards as prescribed by the WMO over and around New Zealand. In particular, data are collected through:

- Surface observations over New Zealand
- Upper air observations using a variety of means ground-based equipment, aircraft, weather radars
- Voluntary observing ships
- A network of drifting buoys in the Tasman Sea.

Norm Henry, General Manager of Science and Strategy, is the current permanent representative of New Zealand with the WMO.

=== MetraWeather ===
MetraWeather (Australia) Pty Ltd, MetraWeather (UK) Ltd and MetraWeather‌ (Thailand)‌ Ltd are wholly owned subsidiaries of Meteorological Service of New Zealand Limited, providing weather intelligence and information presentation products and services globally under the MetraWeather brand to:

- Port and harbour managers and offshore oil & gas operators
- Transport and related infrastructure operations, including aviation, roading and rail
- Energy generators (combined cycle gas turbine operators, hydro power operators and wind farm operators), retailers and network managers
- Broadcast and interactive media, via the Weatherscape XT weather presentation system
- Retailers and logistics managers

=== Numerical weather prediction ===
The cooperative relationship among the world's national meteorological services enables the sharing of much weather information, including the output from global numerical weather prediction (NWP) models. Meteorologists at MetService routinely use information from the world's major modelling centres for day-to-day production of forecasts and weather warnings.

The global models that MetService uses generally provide reliable forecasts of weather features, like highs and lows, over forecast periods of several days; however, they are less effective at predicting small-scale weather features like sea breezes and localised showers. Such features are often strongly affected by the local geography, which tends to be poorly represented in the global models.

An effective way of dealing with this problem is to use another type of NWP model known as a limited-area model. MetService routinely runs a number of limited-area models based on both MM5 and WRF with lateral boundary conditions provided by each of the available global models. The primary model configuration for regional forecasting in New Zealand has a horizontal spacing between grid points of 12 km, which allows weather features down to about 50 km wide to be represented (highs and lows are thousands of kilometres wide). This domain is nested within a much larger domain of 60 km grid spacing, which enables the weather to be modelled over quite a large geographical area for reasonable computational cost.

== Weather forecasts for New Zealand ==
Forecasts and warnings funded by the New Zealand government include:

=== Land ===
- Basic public and mountain forecasts
- Warnings of hazardous weather affecting land areas

=== Marine ===
- Warnings of gales, storms and hurricanes for New Zealand's marine area of responsibility, METAREA XIV
- Synopses and forecasts for New Zealand's marine area of responsibility, METAREA XIV
- Warnings and forecasts for coastal waters

=== Aviation (ICAO services) ===
- Meteorological Watch Office (MWO)
- Volcanic Ash Advisory Centre (VAAC)
- OPMET data

== The Pacific ==
MetService maintains close links with the meteorological agencies of various Pacific Island states.

All warnings of hazardous weather for the South Pacific region, normally received from the Regional Specialized Meteorological Center in Nadi, Fiji, are forwarded to Radio New Zealand International and to the Ministry of Foreign Affairs and Trade.

MetService provides backup for the main warning and forecasting responsibilities of the Regional Specialized Meteorological Center in Nadi, Fiji, should that centre temporarily shut down or be cut off, possibly due to a direct hit by a cyclone. They also take over Primary warning responsibility should a cyclone move to the south of 25S.

== See also ==
- 2026–27 South Pacific cyclone season
- Climate of New Zealand
