= RV Tangaroa =

New Zealand research vessel

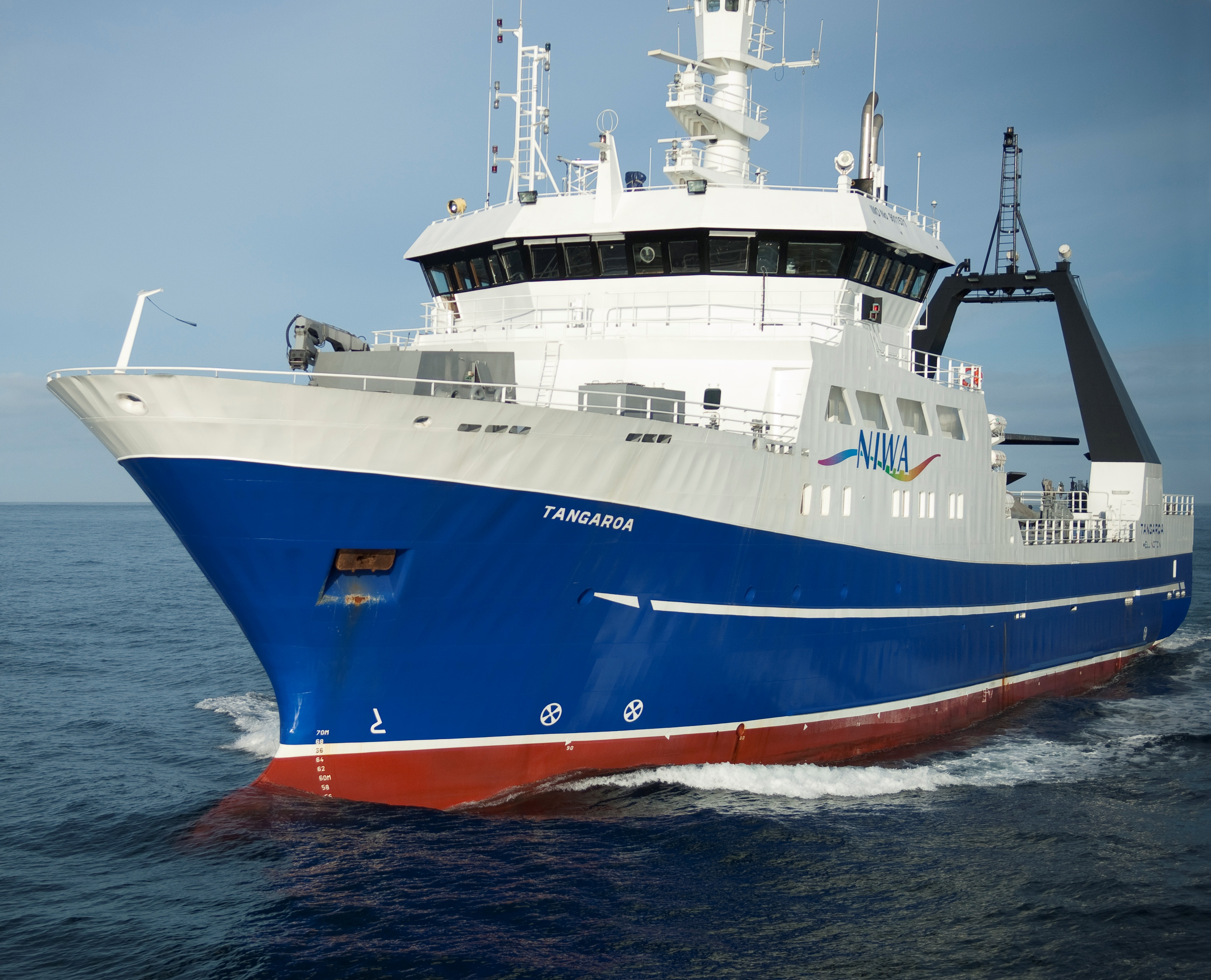
- RV Tangaroa

History

New Zealand
- Name: RV Tangaroa
- Namesake: Tangaroa
- Owner: NIWA Vessel Management Ltd
- Operator: Earth Sciences New Zealand
- Ordered: 1989
- Builder: Mjellem & Karlsen Verft, Bergen, Norway
- Laid down: January 1990
- Launched: April 1991
- Acquired: June 1991
- Commissioned: June 1991
- In service: June 1991
- Homeport: Wellington
- Identification: MMSI number: 512000058; IMO number: 9011571; Call sign: VHDM
- Status: Active as of 2018

General characteristics
- Tonnage: 2,291 GT
- Length: 70 m (230 ft)
- Beam: 13.8 m (45 ft)
- Draft: 7 m (23 ft)
- Propulsion: Wärtsilä Vasa 8R32D, 4,023 horsepower (3,000 kW)
- Speed: 10.5 knots (19.4 km/h; 12.1 mph) (cruise)
- Range: 14,000 nautical miles (26,000 km; 16,000 mi)
- Endurance: 60 days
- Complement: 18 crew, up to 26 scientists.
- Notes: Carries 10 m (33 ft) survey launch RV Pelorus and a 5.8 m (19 ft) inflatable work boat.

RV Tangaroa is a research vessel operated by Earth Sciences New Zealand (formerly NIWA). It was purpose-built as a Deepwater Research Vessel for the then Ministry of Agriculture and Fisheries Research Centre at a cost of $27 million to replace the ageing GRV James Cook. It has a DNV classification of 1A1 (stern trawler) and Ice 1C (sufficient strength and power to operate in ice floes up to 0.4 metres (16 in) thick). It was transferred to the new National Institute of Water and Atmospheric Research in 1992.

Tangaroa operates for 320 to 340 days per year conducting fisheries research in New Zealand's Exclusive Economic Zone and marine research in the waters surrounding Antarctica. It is equipped for hydrographic, bathymetric and oceanographic surveys to measure and map various properties of the ocean and seabed; biological surveys; and for both acoustic and trawl fisheries surveys. It can trawl to 4,000 metres (13,000 ft) and conduct acoustic soundings down to 10,000 metres (33,000 ft).

In 2010 Tangaroa received a $20 million upgrade including a dynamic positioning system. This allows the ship to "automatically maintain a vessel in a fixed position at sea (within a few metres) by using its own propellers and thrusters". NIWA defended contracting the work to a Singapore dockyard to do the work instead of using the Devonport Naval Base Dockyard.

On one voyage in 2003, scientists aboard RV Tangaroa discovered over 500 species of fish and 1,300 species of invertebrate, and the tooth of an extinct megalodon.

In October–November 2016, a collaborative team of researchers on Tangaroa from Auckland Museum, University of Auckland, Massey University, NIWA and the Museum of New Zealand Te Papa Tongarewa undertook research around Kermadec Islands. The multi-disciplinary team investigated the biodiversity of organisms living on the ocean floor and at midwater. The marine mammal populations were examined to determine what animal and plant species are shared between mainland New Zealand and the Kermadec region. Following the November 2016 Kaikōura earthquake, the ship was diverted to collect seafloor shallow cores between 14 and 19 November across and along the submarine Kaikoura Canyon.

Andrew Leachman served as the ship's first captain for more than 20 years, bringing the ship to New Zealand from Norway, and taking it as far north as New Caledonia and as far south as Antarctica.

== See also ==
- HMNZS Manawanui - former dive and hydrographic survey vessel
- RV Kaharoa - other NIWA research vessel
