= Andrew Leachman =

New Zealand research ship captain and New Zealand Antarctic Medal recipient

Andrew Leachman NZAM
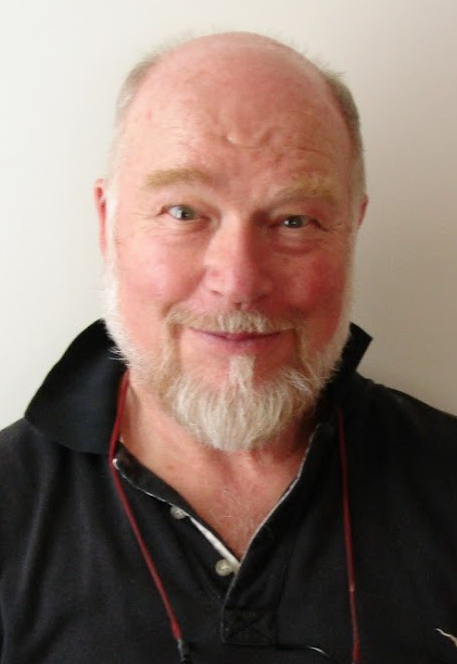
- Leachman in 2008
- Born: 6 April 1945; Cleethorpes, Lincolnshire, England
- Died: 16 September 2017 (aged 72); Nelson, New Zealand
- Occupations: Sea captain, writer
- Employer(s): National Institute of Water and Atmospheric Research; Royal New Zealand Navy
- Children: Siobhan Leachman
- Awards: Honorary captain of the Royal New Zealand Navy

Andrew Leachman NZAM (6 April 1945 – 16 September 2017) was a master mariner with more than 55 years of seagoing experience. He captained New Zealand's research vessel Tangaroa for more than 20 years. He was posthumously awarded the New Zealand Antarctic Medal. A species of marine sea cucumber was named in his honour.

== Early life ==
Leachman was born in 1945 in Cleethorpes, Lincolnshire, England, and grew up in nearby Grimsby.

== Career ==
Leachman began his maritime career as a 15-year-old galley boy on a trawler working on boats fishing off the Labrador coast. Eventually, he became an officer cadet, working with the New Zealand Shipping Company, which was involved in transporting New Zealand's beef, mutton and lamb to the world. In 1973, he was employed by the Ministry of Agriculture and Fisheries as first mate on the research vessel, the James Cook. Ten days later the captain of the James Cook went on leave and Leachman, then aged 27, had to take over command of the ship.

In 1991, there were plans for the James Cook to be replaced with a ship to be built in Bergen, Norway. Leachman flew to Norway to see the new research vessel, the RV Tangaroa, a $27 million state-of-the-art 2,282-tonne ship. This was New Zealand's only ice-strengthened deep-water research vessel. After inspecting the ship, he brought it home to New Zealand arriving in Wellington on 20 July 1991.

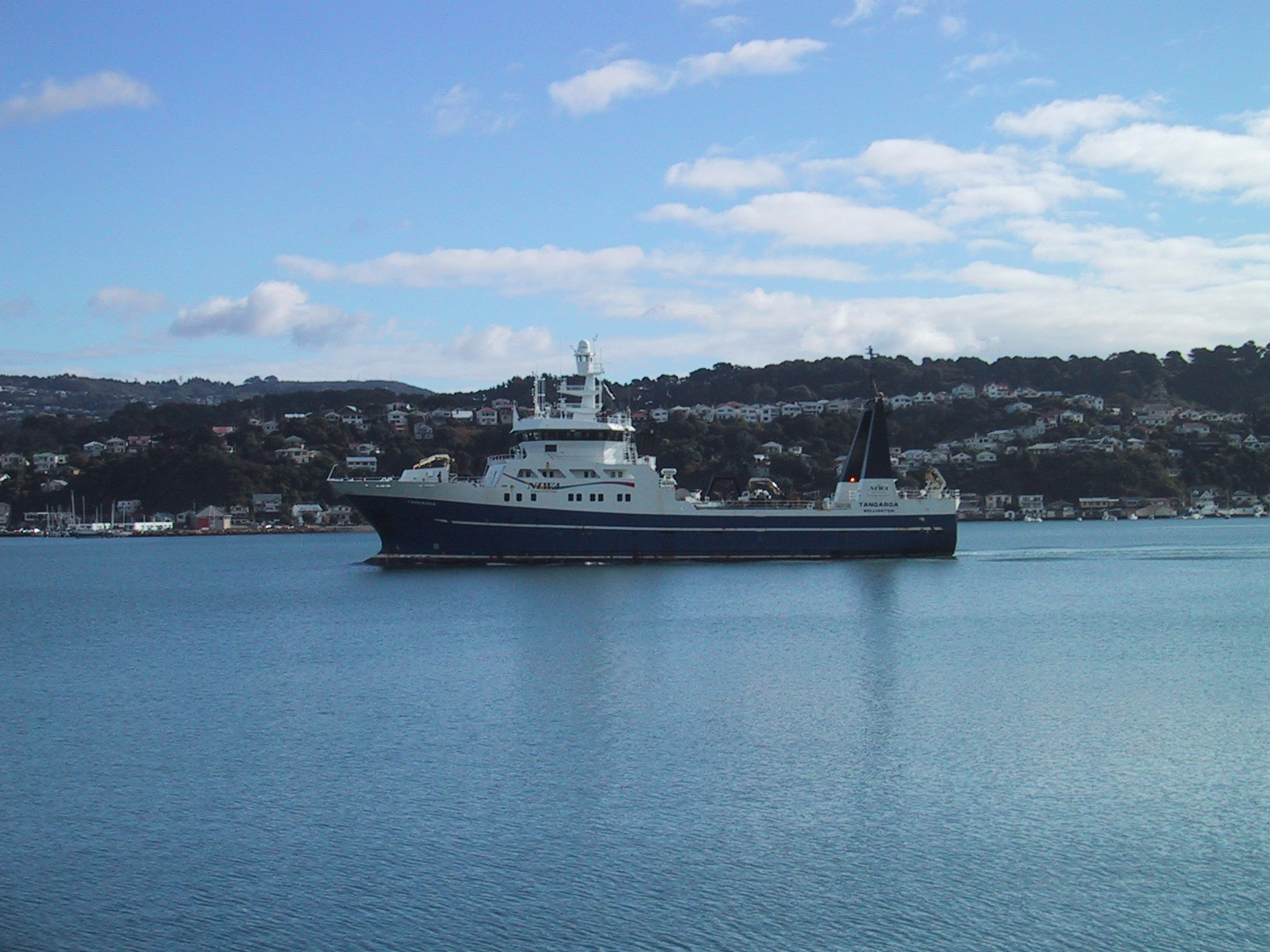
RV Tangaroa in Wellington

From 1991 to 2011, Leachman captained the Tangaroa taking the ship as far north as New Caledonia and as far south as Antarctica. On one voyage in 2003, scientists aboard Tangaroa discovered over 500 species of fish and 1,300 species of invertebrate, and the tooth of an extinct megalodon.

In 2011, the Royal New Zealand Navy (RNZN) planned to invest in two new 85 m 1900-tonne ships to venture into the Southern Ocean to combat illegal fishing. Leachman was asked to inspect one of the vessels, HMNZS Wellington, to make sure the vessels would be suitable for handling the notorious pack ice of the Southern Ocean, and in so doing, he joined the RNZN as an ice navigation consultant.

Leachman retired in 2015 aged 70, a veteran of fourteen Antarctic voyages.

== Personal life ==
After settling in New Zealand, Leachman became a naturalised New Zealand citizen in 1978. He was married and had three daughters. A keen jazz musician, he played tenor saxophone with the Woollaston Jazz & Blues Nelson Festival for many years and was a Nelson Jazz Club life member. Besides jazz, his interests included olive growing, cycling and the Antarctic explorer, Sir Ernest Shackleton as well as other members of the Imperial Trans-Antarctic Expedition.

== Awards and recognition ==
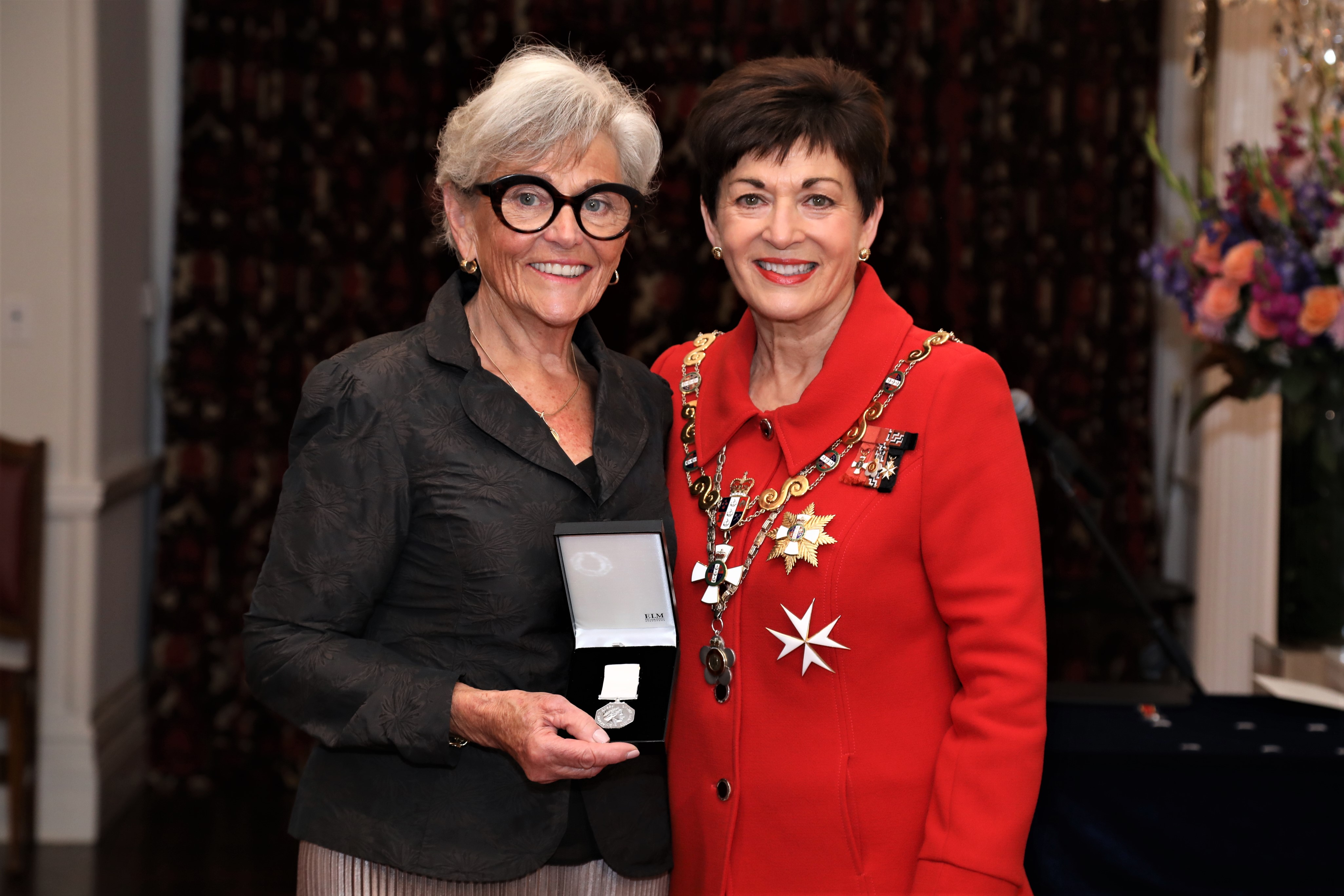
Vivienne Leachman (left) receiving the New Zealand Antarctic Medal from the governor-general, Dame Patsy Reddy, on behalf of her late husband, at Government House, Wellington, on 30 April 2019

Leachman was made an honorary captain of the Royal New Zealand Navy in June 2017 by Navy head Rear Admiral John Martin. In the 2019 New Year Honours, he was posthumously awarded the New Zealand Antarctic Medal.

A species of Antarctic sea cucumber was named in Leachman's honour – Pentactella (formerly Laevocnus) leachmani. On 16 July 2020, an undersea hill in the Southern Ocean, Leachman Hill, was officially named after Leachman (renamed from Leachman Ridge to Leachman Hill on 18 November 2021).

== Selected publications ==
- Leachman, Andrew, (2016) "Harry McNish – An insight into Shackleton's Carpenter", Antarctic, 34(3):26–29
- Leachman, Andrew, (2015) Letter, Antarctic, 33 (1):6
- McKoy, J. L., and A. Leachman. "Aggregations of ovigerous female rock lobsters, Jasus edwardsii (Decapoda: Palinuridae)." New Zealand Journal of Marine and Freshwater Research 16.2 (1982): 141–146.
