= Siobhan Leachman =

New Zealand citizen scientist and Wikimedian

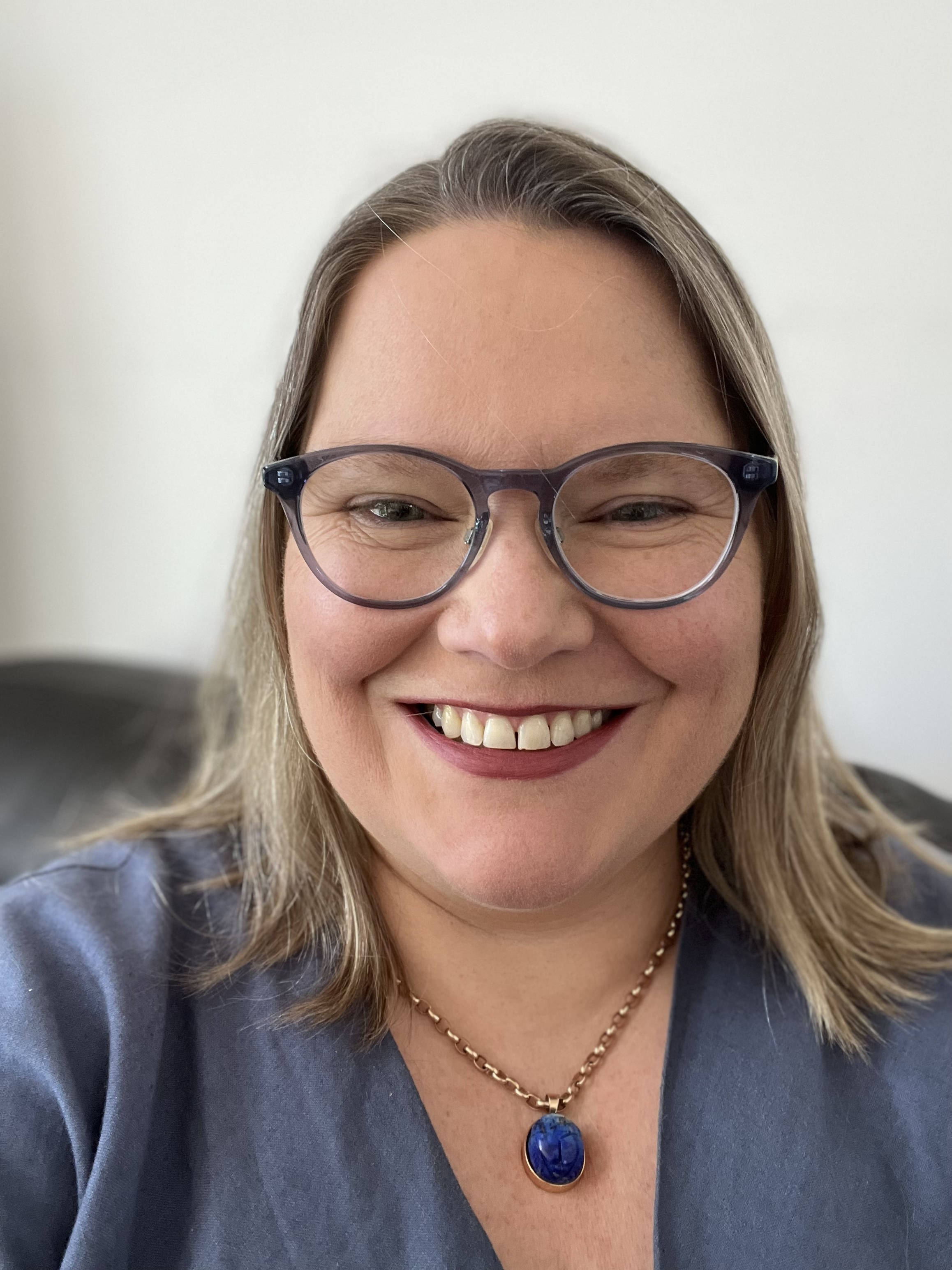
- Leachman in 2022
- Father: Andrew Leachman
- Awards: Companion of Auckland War Memorial Museum; Wikimedia Laureate (2023)

Siobhan Leachman is a New Zealand citizen scientist, open knowledge advocate, and Wikimedian whose work focuses on natural history. In 2023 Leachman was awarded the Wikimedia Laureate award. She transitioned to citizen science after a career in law, due to her interest in natural history and archival preservation.

== Life and career ==
Leachman is a lawyer by background and a self-described "stay-at-home mother of two". Bored after her children began attending kindergarten, she began her volunteer work at the instigation of her twin sister Victoria Leachman (Head of Collections Access at Te Papa) with the Smithsonian Transcription Center, transcribing diaries and field journals such as those of Vernon and Florence Bailey and categorising bumblebee collections of Arthur Wilson Stelfox. She moved on to volunteer projects with the Biodiversity Heritage Library, Zooniverse, the Australian Museum, and the New Zealand Virtual Herbarium.

In 2014 at the encouragement of the Smithsonian Transcription Center she began working on Wikipedia; her first article, on botanist and collector Charlotte Cortlandt Ellis, was quickly flagged for deletion. She was spending at least two hours a day on Wikipedia, Wikimedia Commons, Wikidata, and iNaturalist, and organised several volunteer events with Wikipedian Mike Dickison. Her Wikipedia work focussed on women in science, neglected scientific collectors, and the endemic moths of New Zealand. Inspired by Ahi Pepe Mothnet, her project to create articles on all 1,800 New Zealand endemic moth species draws on openly-licensed images from iNaturalist, the Auckland Museum, and the New Zealand Arthropod Collection. She has been an advocate of open licenses for digital collections of museums and cultural institutions. She has also worked on creating Wikidata entries and Wikipedia articles for female scientific illustrators in the collection of the Biodiversity Heritage Library.

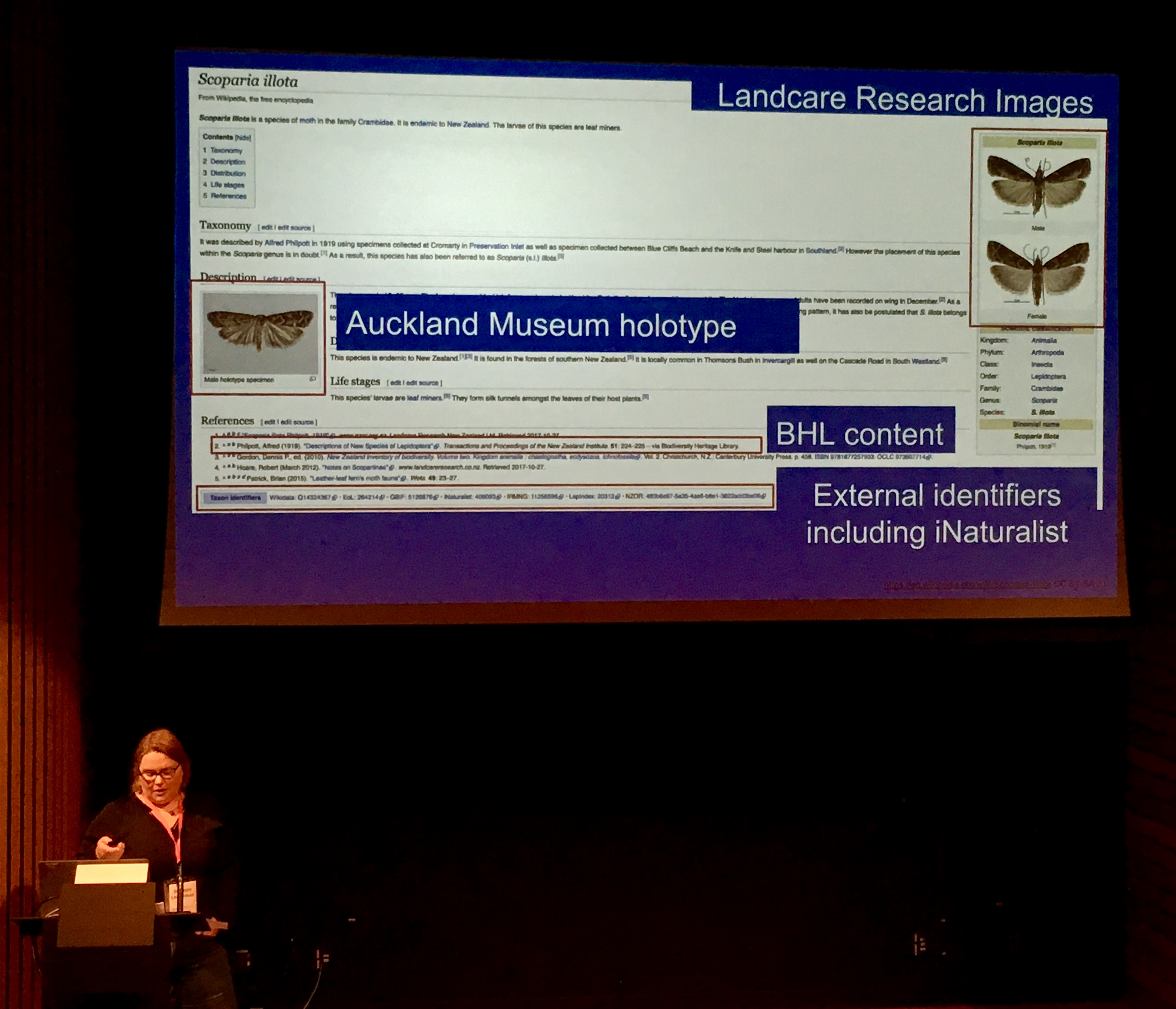
Leachman presenting on her project to describe New Zealand endemic moths at WikiCite 2018

Leachman has presented at VALA, New Zealand's National Digital Forum, and WikidataCon. The Smithsonian invited her to be on the "Build the Crowdsourcing Community of Your Dreams" panel at SXSW in 2016. In 2018 she was awarded a travel scholarship to present at the WikiCite conference in Berkeley, where she spoke about the difficulties of finding metadata on historical biodiversity literature. In 2019 at Biodiversity Next in Leiden she spoke about using Bloodhound Tracker (now Bionomia) to link museum specimen data to collectors.

In 2019 Auckland Museum made Leachman a Companion of Auckland War Memorial Museum in recognition of her work with their openly-licensed digital collection images. She has contributed to the digitization of their openly licensed collections. In 2023 Leachman was awarded the Wikimedia Laureate award.

Leachman actively contributes to Wikipedia, Wikimedia Commons, and Wikidata, focusing on topics like New Zealand's natural history and underrepresented figures in science. She has also campaigned to include indigenous knowledge and promote the representation of women in science-related entries.

== Advocacy and impact ==
Leachman is a vocal advocate for citizen science and the importance of open knowledge. She frequently speaks at conferences and workshops, emphasizing the need to close the gender gap in science representation and ensure the inclusion of indigenous knowledge systems.

== Selected works ==
- Groom, Quentin; Bräuchler, Christian; Cubey, Robert; Dillen, Mathias; Huybrechts, Pieter; Kearney, Nicole; Klazenga, Niels; Leachman, Siobhan; Paul, Deborah L.; Rogers, Heather; Santos, Joaquim; Shorthouse, David; Vaughan, Alison; Mering, Sabine von; Haston, Elspeth (10 October 2022). "The disambiguation of people names in biological collections". Biodiversity Data Journal. 10 e86089. doi:10.3897/BDJ.10.e86089. ISSN 1314-2828. PMC 9836581. PMID 36761559.
- Quentin J. Groom; Anton Güntsch; Pieter Huybrechts; et al. (27 November 2020). "People are essential to linking biodiversity data". Database. 2020. doi:10.1093/DATABASE/BAAA072. ISSN 1758-0463. PMC 7805432. Wikidata Q104815631.
- Waagmeester, Andra; Mietchen, Daniel; Leachman, Siobhan; Groom, Quentin (2019). "Using Crowd-curation to Improve Taxon Annotations on the Wikimedia Infrastructure". Biodiversity Information Science and Standards. 3 e35216. doi:10.3897/biss.3.35216.
- Leachman, Siobhan (18 June 2019). "Wikimedia Projects and Citizen Science". Biodiversity Information Science and Standards. 3 e34722. doi:10.3897/biss.3.34722.
- Leachman, Siobhan (17 May 2018). "How A Citizen Scientist Can Reuse & Link Biodiversity Heritage Library Data". Biodiversity Information Science and Standards. 2 e25298. doi:10.3897/biss.2.25298.
- Ferriter, Meghan; Rosenfeld, Christine; Boomer, Dana; Burgess, Carla; Leachman, Siobhan; Leachman, Victoria; Moses, Heidi; Pickering, Felicia; Shuler, Megan E. (2016). "Crowdsourcing as Practice and Method in the Smithsonian Transcription Center". Collections. 12 (2): 207–225. doi:10.1177/155019061601200213. S2CID 69364344.

== See also ==
- List of Wikipedia people
