= Robert E. Leachman =

American lawyer, politician, and judge

Robert E. Leachman (1806 – June 13, 1892) was an American lawyer, politician, and judge in Mississippi. He served several terms in the Mississippi State Senate, and was appointed United States Attorney for the District of Mississippi.

== Early life, education, and career ==
Born in 1806 in Virginia, his family moved to Kentucky when he was still young, and there he was raised and educated. He graduated from Transylvania University Law School with a law degree.

He moved to Greene County, Alabama where he entered the practice of law. Just before the American Civil War he moved to Meridian in Lauderdale County.

== Political and judicial service ==
Leachman was elected to the state senate without opposition, representing Lauderdale County and Newton County in 1865, just after the war. At the time of his election it was noted that "Mr. Leachman has been a prominent member of the bar in this county for many years, but heretofore has never been a candidate for office. He is a gentleman of fine practical sense, good address, and will make a most useful member". He had been a Whig until the end of the war when he became a Republican. He also continued to practice law until he was appointed in 1866 to the position of United States Attorney, remaining in that office until 1868, when he was appointed as circuit judge for Newton County by the Military Governor General Alvan Cullem Gillem.

He served in the state senate again from 1870 to 1871, representing the 10th district. including Lauderdale County and Kemper County.

During Reconstruction he was re-appointed as circuit judge for Newton County by Governor James L. Alcorn and served in that position until 1876 when he was replaced by James S. Hamm.

== Later life ==
After leaving the bench, Leachman continued to live in Meridian until the death of his wife in 1884, after which he moved to Anniston, Alabama, with his daughter, Mrs. J. A. Douglass, and where he remained until his death.

In 1877 he visited the victims of the Chisolm massacre in Kemper County, Mississippi.

== Personal life and death ==
Leachman was married twice, first to Sarah Emeline Rencher in 1839, and then to Mary Brooke from Greene County, Alabama, in 1851. Leachman's wife Mary died in June 1884.

Leachman had two sons and a daughter with his first wife. One son was also named Robert E. Leachman (c. 1842 – Oct. 1879), which was the cause of some confusion; an April 1875 correction in The Weekly Mississippi Pilot notes that another paper had errantly reported that "Judge R.E. Leachman" was visiting the editor of a Republican newspaper, when in fact it "was from R. E. Leachman, Esq., Postmaster at Meridian, and not from Judge R. E. Leachman", further noting that the confusion "arose from the gentlemen bearing similar initials and being, also, father and son".

Leachman's age at the time of his death was reported differently in different sources. One obituary also claimed that he "had the distinction of being the originator of the Nicaragua Canal scheme, having advocated the enterprise in a speech at a Memphis Convention thirty-six years ago", although no other biographical sources mention this.
