= Earth Sciences New Zealand =

Research organisation in New Zealand, established 2025

- Logo of Earth Sciences New Zealand

Research institute overview
- Formed: July 1, 2025 (15 months ago)
- Preceding agencies: NIWA; GNS Science
- Employees: 1,200
- Website: earthsciences.nz

Earth Sciences New Zealand (formally New Zealand Institute for Earth Science Limited) is a Public Research Organisation in New Zealand with a focus on "supporting energy security and sustainability; developing land, marine and mineral resources; and improving resilience to natural hazards and climate-related risks".

== Formation ==
In March 2024 Cabinet approved the formation of the Science System Advisory Group, chaired by Professor Sir Peter Gluckman to review the science, innovation and technology system in New Zealand. Following the release of the Advisory Group’s first report, Science, Innovation and Technology Minister Judith Collins announced the seven Crown Research Institutes would be reorganised into three Public Research Organisations focusing on bio-economy, earth sciences, and health and forensic sciences.

The formation of a new New Zealand Institute for Earth Science was announced by Minister of Science, Innovation and Technology Dr Shane Reti on 14 May 2025. The Institute came into being as a Public Research Organisation on 1 July 2025. It was created from the merger of National Institute of Water and Atmospheric Research (NIWA) and GNS Science. The Government had also announced its intention for NIWA to acquire the MetService in September 2024, however this requires the passage of the Meteorological Services (Acquisition and Policies) Legislation Amendment Bill, which as at the dissolution of Parliament on 1 October 2026 had not yet occurred.

== Board ==
In May 2025, Minister Shane Reti announced the chair of the new board would be David Smol, previously chair of GNS. Mary-Anne Macleod was appointed deputy chair, with other board members Paul Connell, Paul White, Peter Landon-Lane, and Professor Chris Bumby.

== Chief Executive ==
In June 2025, John Morgan was appointed transition chief executive of Earth Sciences New Zealand, effective from 1 July 2025. In November 2025, James Palmer was announced as the organisation's permanent chief executive, taking up the position on 2 March 2026.
