= Rutherford Discovery Fellowships =

The Rutherford Discovery Fellowships were a primary funding mechanism for early-to-mid-career academics in New Zealand. Established in 2010, they were administered by the Royal Society Te Apārangi and awarded yearly, via a multi-round peer-review and interview process, and funded by money diverted from the axed Foundation for Research, Science and Technology Postdoctoral Fellowships. Recipients of the fellowship were typically faculty members at New Zealand universities, or appointed in Fellow roles, a position comparable to "research faculty" or "senior postdoc" in the United States. In 2025, the fellowship scheme was replaced with the New Zealand Mana Tūānuku Research Leader Fellowship.

The Ministry of Science and Innovation commissioned a review of the scheme in 2011, following a public letter raising concerns about a gap in early and mid-career support for researchers. The review, conducted by the government Social Wellbeing Agency (The Hub), interviewed fellows, the selection panel, and representatives from host institutions and the Royal Society. A draft report is available but the final report and recommendations do not appear to have been made public.

== Major contributions across research fields ==
More than a dozen Rutherford Discovery Fellowships were awarded every year, and by the final 2023 round life-sciences and humanities projects each accounted for 42 per cent of the portfolio, with the remainder in the physical sciences, engineering and mathematics.

The breadth of topics funded, and the influence fellows have gone on to exert in their disciplines, illustrates the scheme's strategic role in New Zealand’s research ecosystem.

Biomedical and health sciences. University of Auckland neuro-immunologist Dr Justin Rustenhoven (2021 fellow) is tracing how age-related inflammation damages the meningeal lymphatic “drain-pipes” of the brain, work that points to new therapeutic targets for Alzheimer’s disease and other dementias.

Climate and marine science. Massey University marine ecologist Dr Libby Liggins (2020) is combining genomics, ocean-current modelling and citizen-science "fish watches" to identify tohu—early genetic and distributional signals—of climate-driven shifts in Aotearoa's coastal biodiversity, providing communities and mana whenua with data for proactive kaitiakitanga.

Green chemistry and clean technology. Organometallic chemist Dr Mathew Anker (Victoria University of Wellington, 2022) is designing lanthanide(II) hydride catalysts able to fix atmospheric nitrogen at ambient pressure, a step towards fossil-fuel-free ammonia fertiliser production and a potential one-per-cent cut in global CO₂ emissions.

Computer science and software engineering. Dr Kelly Blincoe (University of Auckland, 2022) is leading the first longitudinal study of Aotearoa's software workforce to understand why women leave the industry and to create more inclusive development tools and practices, research that also informs ACM diversity policy worldwide.

Public-health and social equity research. Psychologist Dr Jaimie Veale (University of Waikato, 2020) is extending the national "Counting Ourselves" survey into a multi-wave international study that tracks how access to gender-affirmation and other social determinants shape the health of transgender and non-binary people.

Indigenous politics and civic participation. Associate Professor Lara Greaves (Te Herenga Waka—Victoria University of Wellington, 2023) is co-creating tools with Māori communities to lift voter turnout, improve access to political information and strengthen data sovereignty—work that addresses structural barriers to participation for wāhine Māori and other under-represented groups.

Individual fellowships have also seeded internationally recognised research in the physical sciences; for example, laser physicist Dr Miro Erkintalo’s 2015 award preceded his Prime-Minister’s MacDiarmid Emerging Scientist Prize for micro-comb technology. Collectively, the programme support a group of independent research leaders whose work contributes to national research capability in areas including pandemic modelling to quantum photonics, highlighting the potential, long-term value of sustained, investigator-led funding.

== Replacement by Tāwhia te Mana Research Fellowships ==
In July 2023, the Ministry of Business, Innovation and Employment (MBIE) announced a new workforce-support initiative that would "retire " the Rutherford Discovery, Rutherford Foundation and James Cook Research Fellowships after the 2023 funding rounds.

From 2024 onward, early-, mid- and established-career researchers would instead compete for three Māori-named awards grouped under the Tāwhia te Mana Research Fellowships portfolio:

- Mana Tūāpapa Future Leader Fellowship (0–4 years post-PhD)
- Mana Tūānuku Research Leader Fellowship (4–12 years post-PhD)
- Mana Tūārangi Distinguished Researcher Fellowship (established researchers)

Royal Society Te Apārangi continues to administer the new fellowships, and existing Rutherford Discovery Fellows will receive their contracted support until those awards conclude.

== Fellows ==
2010 | 2011 | 2012 | 2013 | 2014 | 2015 | 2016 | 2017 | 2018 | 2019 | 2020 | 2021 | 2022 | 2023

Year	Recipient	Host institution	Project title
2010	Donna Rose Addis	University of Auckland	Building our autobiographies: how the brain constructs past and future autobiographical events
2010	Ashton S. Bradley	University of Otago	The birth, life, and death of a quantum vortex dipole
2010	Murray Cox	Massey University	Computational reconstruction of genomic evolution
2010	Alexei J. Drummond	University of Auckland	Computational analysis for molecular ecology and evolutionary biology
2010	Paul P. Gardner	University of Canterbury	Bioinformatic approaches to functionally characterise RNAs
2010	Noam Greenberg	Victoria University of Wellington	Effective randomness, lowness notions and higher computability
2010	Jennifer Hay	University of Canterbury	Episodic word memory
2010	Eric Le Ru	Victoria University of Wellington	Surface-enhanced spectroscopy: from fundamentals to applications
2010	John N. J. Reynolds	University of Otago	Improving brain function: a balancing act
2010	Jason Tylianakis	University of Canterbury	Reweaving the web of life: the interplay of species traits and resource constraints during the assembly and disassembly of ecological networks in changing environments.
2011	Quentin D. Atkinson	University of Auckland	A Darwinian approach to understanding the cultural evolution of language and cooperation
2011	Nancy Bertler	Victoria University of Wellington	The Roosevelt Island Climate Evolution (RICE) project
2011	Peter C. Fineran	University of Otago	How do bacterial ‘adaptive immune systems’ protect microbial cells against viral infection?
2011	David Goldstone	University of Auckland	Trimming retroviral infection: Structural investigations of TRIM protein function
2011	Chris Hann	University of Canterbury	Advanced rocket system modelling and control for supersonic and hypersonic flight
2011	Justin M. Hodgkiss	Victoria University of Wellington	Time-resolved optical spectroscopy to guide the design of photoactive organic semiconductor devices
2011	Nicole Moreham	Victoria University of Wellington	The protection of privacy in English private law
2011	Wayne M. Patrick	Massey University	New insights into old problems: evolution of protein folds, protein functions and streamlined genomes
2011	Anthony M. Poole	University of Canterbury	How does complexity emerge in cellular systems?
2011	Nick T Shears	University of Auckland	Maintaining healthy marine ecosystems under increased anthropogenic stress and a changing climate
2012	Martin W. Allen	University of Canterbury	Ultraviolet vision – new frontiers in health and technology
2012	Barbara J. Anderson	University of Otago	Battlegrounds and safe havens: disentangling the roles of ecology and evolution in the response of biological communities to climate change
2012	Jessie Jacobsen	University of Auckland	Autism spectrum disorder: hunting for therapeutic targets using genetics
2012	Peter D. Mace	University of Otago	Molecular signalling mechanisms at the interface between cellular life and death
2012	Clemency Montelle	University of Canterbury	New perspectives on the history of the exact sciences in second millennium Sanskrit sources
2012	Shinichi Nakagawa	University of Otago	Multidisciplinary approaches to understanding the maintenance of biological variation
2012	Nicholas Rattenbury	University of Auckland	Toward Earth-II: completing the census of extra-solar planets in the galaxy
2012	Lara Shepherd	Museum of New Zealand Te Papa Tongarewa	Human-induced evolutionary processes on a recently colonised landmass: incipient domestication and spatial dynamics of species’ declines
2012	Geoff Willmott	Industrial Research Limited	The nanofluidic plumber: submicron transport in liquids
2012	Tim Woodfield	University of Otago	New frontiers in musculoskeletal regenerative medicine: biofabrication of cartilage and bone for entire joint resurfacing
2013	Brendon Bradley	University of Canterbury	Earth-shattering detective work: Uncovering the mysteries of unresolved ground motion and geotechnical case-histories from the 2010-2011 Canterbury earthquakes
2013	Dillon Mayhew	Victoria University of Wellington	The mathematics of space and language: matroids and model theory
2013	Robert McKay	Victoria University of Wellington	Antarctic ice sheet-Southern Ocean interactions during greenhouse worlds of the past 23 million years - and consequences for New Zealand climate.
2013	Suresh D. Muthukumaraswamy	University of Auckland	High-frequency brain activity in health and disease
2013	Suetonia Palmer	University of Otago	Improving evidence for decision-makers in chronic kidney disease
2013	Craig Radford	University of Auckland	Using passive acoustics to monitor ecosystem health.
2013	Jonathan Sperry	University of Auckland	Inert C-H bonds: A gateway to molecular complexity
2013	Elizabeth E. Stanley	Victoria University of Wellington	What happened to human rights?: Exploring the changing status of human rights in New Zealand.
2013	Daniel B. Stouffer	University of Canterbury	Toward a general theory of evolution in ecological networks
2013	Angela Wanhalla	University of Otago	Marriage: the politics of private life in New Zealand
2014	Louise Bicknell	University of Otago	Investigating the contribution of genetic variation to shaping human disease
2014	Alys R. Clark	University of Auckland	Biophysical models to predict markers of health in early pregnancy
2014	Francis L. Collins	University of Auckland	Nation and Migration: population mobilities, desires and state practices in 21st century New Zealand
2014	Katie Fitzpatrick	University of Auckland	Rethinking health education and promotion: health capital and diverse youth
2014	Jonathan E. Halpert	Victoria University of Wellington	Novel nanostructured materials and optoelectronic devices: solar cells and LEDs
2014	Kim M. Handley	University of Auckland	Who is eating what in coastal marine sediments? Understanding microbial contributions to coastal marine health, stability and ecosystem functioning.
2014	Michael Knapp	University of Otago	Evolution and conservation of the New Zealand bird fauna - a genomic approach
2014	James C. Russell	University of Auckland	Conservation complexity: scaling vertebrate pest control
2014	Alexander Harwood Taylor	University of Auckland	The signature-testing approach to the evolution of intelligence.
2014	Priscilla M. Wehi	Manaaki Whenua – Landcare Research	Indigenous ecological knowledge, introduced species, and the new New Zealand environment
2015	Jane R. Allison	Massey University	Deciphering molecular choreography
2015	Peng Du	University of Auckland	A joint experimental-modelling strategy for translational gastrointestinal electrophysiology and motility
2015	Miro Erkintalo	University of Auckland	Lighting up New Zealand: Next-generation laser sources for scientific and industrial applications
2015	Nick Golledge	Victoria University of Wellington	Modelling the response of the Antarctic ice-sheet to a warming world and its contribution to future sea-level rise
2015	Annette M. E. Henderson	University of Auckland	Born and raised to cooperate: Identifying how experience shapes our cooperation foundation
2015	Cate Macinnis-Ng	University of Auckland	Thirsty forests under future climates: impact of drought on native ecosystems
2015	Troy L. Merry	University of Auckland	Beta-catenin facilitates skeletal muscle glucose transport and pancreatic beta-cell insulin secretion
2015	Kevin Norton	Victoria University of Wellington	Are the hotspots cold? Using the world's fastest forming soils to measure the contribution of weathering and erosion to global climate stability
2015	Geoffrey Rodgers	University of Canterbury	Ground-Shaking Research: Damage-Free Buildings and Novel Seismic Monitoring Methods for Resilient Cities
2015	Emma L. Scotter	University of Auckland	The Theory of (not quite) Everything: The neglected role of the blood-brain-barrier in motor neuron disease
2015	Logan C. Walker	University of Otago	Preparing for the future of genomic medicine
2015	Gwenda M. Willis	University of Auckland	What stops convicted sex offenders from reoffending? Developing a strengths-based framework for sexual violence prevention
2016	Baptiste Auguié	Victoria University of Wellington	Light and chirality at the nanoscale
2016	Federico Baltar	University of Otago	What makes ‘normal’ normal? Alternative microbial carbon and energy acquisition mechanisms in the neglected high-nutrient low-chlorophyll (HNLC) areas of the ocean
2016	Adam Hartland	University of Waikato	Unlocking the karst record: quantitative proxies of past climates from speleothems
2016	Yoshihiro Kaneko	GNS Science	Structural controls on earthquake behaviour in the Hikurangi subduction mega-thrust
2016	Jenny Malmström	University of Auckland	Signals to cells when and where they are needed
2016	D. G. G. McMillan	University of Canterbury	Biomembrane nanotechnologies for exploring pathogen respiratory adaptation to identify and develop novel antibiotics
2016	Huw Horgan	Victoria University of Wellington	Accelerating ice – the role of water in the flow of ice sheets
2016	Jeremy G. Owen	Victoria University of Wellington	Harnessing the biosynthetic potential of uncultivated microbes for the discovery of new antibiotics
2016	Nicole Roughan	University of Auckland	Jurisprudence without borders: a pluralist theory of law
2016	Rachael C. Shaw	Victoria University of Wellington	Wild intelligence: exploring the evolution, function and conservation applications of cognitive traits
2016	Virginia G. Toy	University of Otago	Weaving the Earth's weak seams: manifestations and mechanical consequences of rock fabric evolution in active faults and shear zones
2017	Emma L. Carroll	University of Auckland	Family matters: developing close kin mark recapture methods to estimate key demographic parameters in natural populations
2017	Claire Charters	University of Auckland	Constitutional Transformation to Accommodate Maori in Aotearoa/New Zealand: Lessons from Around the Globe
2017	Aniruddha Chatterjee	University of Otago	Investigating the origin and consequences of epigenetic alterations in cancer metastasis
2017	Christopher E. Cornwall	Victoria University of Wellington	Physiological and environmental controls of coralline algal calcification under climate change
2017	Alex Gavryushkin	University of Otago	Online algorithms in evolutionary biology
2017	David Hayman	Massey University	From individuals to populations: multi-scale approaches to pathogen emergence
2017	Marwan Katurji	University of Canterbury	The invisible realm of atmospheric coherent turbulent structures: Resolving their dynamics and interaction with Earth's surface
2017	Yvette Perrott	Victoria University of Wellington	Realising the potential of galaxy clusters as cosmological probes
2017	Maxim S. Petrov	University of Auckland	Deciphering the metabolic pathways underlying post-pancreatitis diabetes
2017	Melinda Webber	University of Auckland	Kia tu rangatira ai nga iwi Maori: Living, succeeding, and thriving as iwi Maori
2018	Timothy Angeli	University of Auckland	Electrophysiologically-based diagnostics and therapeutics for gastrointestinal disorders: bridging the gap from engineering benchtop to clinical bedside
2018	Ceridwen Fraser	University of Otago	The race for new space: disentangling the processes that shape global patterns of biodiversity
2018	Sarah Diermeier	University of Otago	Long non-coding RNAs as new drivers of tumour progression
2018	Jay Marlowe	University of Auckland	Dislocation in an age of connection: Mapping refugee settlement trajectories within an increasingly mobile world
2018	Jonathan Squire	University of Otago	Cosmic Turbulence, Microinstabilities, and the Magnetisation of the Universe
2018	Karen Stockin	Massey University	The application of Artificial Intelligence (AI), innovative technologies and evolutionary theory to address the conservation-welfare nexus during human-wildlife interactions
2018	Lisa Te Morenga	Victoria University of Wellington	Naku te rourou, nau te rourou, ka oranga ai te iwi (With my food basket and your food basket the people will be well)
2018	Alice Theadom	Auckland University of Technology	Developing a biopsychosocial model of mild traumatic brain injury
2018	Jonathan Tonkin	University of Canterbury	Rethinking ecological networks in changing environments
2018	Krushil Watene	Massey University	Intergenerational Justice: Obligations and Decision-Making
2019	David Aguirre	Massey University	Ecosystems on unstable foundations: examining the potential for coral and macroalgal responses to global change
2019	Olivia Faull	University of Otago	Breathing and anxiety: Understanding the miscommunication between brain and body, and how best to treat it
2019	Jodie Hunter	Massey University	Developing Mathematical Inquiry Communities: Using a strength based approach to provide equitable opportunities to learn mathematics for diverse learner
2019	Andrew McDaid	University of Auckland	Uncovering new knowledge of neurological and musculoskeletal rehabilitation mechanisms using novel data-driven methods
2019	Alexander Melnikov	Massey University	Applications of modern computability
2019	Volker Nock	University of Canterbury	Electrotaxis and protrusive force generation in fungal and oomycete pathogens – Pathways to new biocontrol strategies
2019	Melanie Ooi	University of Waikato	Resilient and efficient light-based plant detection and characterisation for precision agriculture and environmental sustainability
2019	Matthew Roskruge	Massey University	The economics of social capital from a Māori perspective
2019	Damian Scarf	University of Otago	The Belonging Project
2019	Jenni Stanley	University of Waikato	What does protection sound like? A modern approach to understanding New Zealand's underwater soundscapes and acoustic pressures
2019	Ágnes Szabó	Massey University	Growing old in an adopted land: Cross-fertilizing ageing and acculturation research
2020	Siautu Alefaio-Tugia	Massey University	Redefining the humanitarian landscape: Pacific-diasporic disaster resilience
2020	Michele Bannister	University of Canterbury	Emissaries from the darkness: understanding planetary systems through their smallest worlds
2020	Nathaniel Davis	Victoria University of Wellington	Pushing the limits on renewable energy technology through hybrid organic/inorganic nanomaterials
2020	Jemma Geoghegan	University of Otago and ESR	Ecological barriers and drivers of virus emergence
2020	Nathan Kenny	University of Otago	Stretched mussels: tracing the genetic basis of resilience to climate change and ocean acidification in cultured green-lipped mussels (kuku) from genome to embryo
2020	Gabor Kereszturi	Massey University	Caught in action - volcano surveillance with hyperspectral remote sensing
2020	Libby Liggins	Massey University	Tohu of change for Aotearoa New Zealand’s marine biodiversity
2020	Martino Lupini	Victoria University of Wellington	Computing the shape of chaos
2020	Jaimie Veale	University of Waikato	Health inequities, social determinants of health, and gender affirmation: Transgender health research guided by principles of self-determination and informed consent
2020	Adele Williamson	University of Waikato	In extremis: how bacteria replicate, repair and diversify their genomes in challenging environments
2021	Alana Alexander	University of Otago	Creating purakau of past, present, and future conservation impacts using genomics
2021	Htin Lin Aung	University of Otago	Development of patient- and community-centric tuberculosis healthcare services: a multidisciplinary approach to close the health inequalities gap
2021	Amanda Black	Lincoln University	Genomes to giants: restoring resilient soil ecosystems in kauri forests
2021	Calum Chamberlain	Victoria University of Wellington	Probing the variability in earthquake nucleation mechanisms in New Zealand
2021	Kelly Dombroski	University of Canterbury	Transitioning to caring economies through transformative community investments
2021	Jessica Lai	Victoria University of Wellington	Patents and power: a critical analysis of knowledge governance
2021	Khoon Lim	University of Otago	3D bioprinting of functional vascular networks
2021	Samuel Mehr	University of Auckland	Psychological and cultural foundations of music
2021	Sereana Naepi	University of Auckland	Planning for change: an analysis of neoliberalism, equity and change in higher education
2021	Michael Price	Victoria University of Wellington	The physics of next generation solar panels and light emitters for sustainability
2021	Justin Rustenhoven	University of Auckland	Cleaning the brain drains: augmenting meningeal lymphatic dysfunction in aging and neurodegenerative disease to alleviate cognitive decline.
2022	Ruggiero (Rino) Lovreglio	Massey University	Pedestrian Evacuation Dynamics
2022	Laura Revell	University of Canterbury	Airborne microplastics in a changing climate
2022	Michelle LaRue	University of Canterbury	Southern Ocean connections: A metacommunity approach to understanding changes in the marine predator guild
2022	Patrick Savage	University of Auckland	The music-language continuum: A global analysis
2022	Guy Sinclair	University of Auckland	Governing the Pacific: International Legal Ordering in Moana-nui-a-Kiwa
2022	Hannah Waddington	Victoria University of Wellington	Transforming the clinical pathway for young autistic children and their whānau in Aotearoa New Zealand
2022	Holly Winton	Victoria University of Wellington	Southern Ocean phytoplankton and climate: Understanding the ability of phytoplankton to modulate climate in a warmer world
2022	Julie Deslippe	Victoria University of Wellington	Plant-soil interactions, biodiversity and mountain ecosystem function in an era of global change
2022	Kelly Blincoe	University of Auckland	Towards more inclusive software engineering practices and tools to retain women in software engineering
2022	Mathew Anker	Victoria University of Wellington	Lanthanide(II) Hydrides for Nitrogen Fixation and Ammonia Production
2022	Terry Isson	University of Waikato	Will silicate minerals be the hero or villain in this warming world?
2022	Phoebe Macrae	University of Canterbury	Cross-disciplinary characterization of upper aerodigestive function
2023	Natalia Amy Yewdall	University of Canterbury	Enhancing enzyme networks in condensates for carbon capture and sustainable synthesis
2023	Simon J. Barker	Victoria University of Wellington	Magma forensics at New Zealand’s volcanoes: understanding the magmatic systems and processes that drive eruptions
2023	Kimberley O'Sullivan	University of Otago	HOusing, energy, and MEntal health and wellbeing (HOME) Programme
2023	Elizabeth Macpherson	University of Canterbury	Blue Carbon Futures in Aotearoa New Zealand: Law, Climate, Resilience
2023	Rosemary Brown	University of Otago	Wiring the brain for motherhood: the critical role of hormones in maternal mood and behaviour
2023	Megan Leask	University of Otago	Omics and molecular strategies for precision medicine target discovery in Māori and Pacific peoples
2023	Emma Nolan	University of Auckland	Tools for our future: harnessing NZ-specific advanced cancer models to drive research discovery in Aotearoa
2023	Lara Greaves	Victoria University of Wellington	More than the 3 Ps: Enhancing Participation in Politics, Policy, the Public Sphere, and Political Science
2023	Tom Logan	University of Canterbury	Incorporating cascading risk and multiple uncertainties into climate adaptation planning
2023	Rebecca Lawton	University of Waikato	Help for kelp in a warming world: A multi-disciplinary toolkit to identify resilience and improve heat tolerance of kelp for restoration and aquaculture
2023	Marta Rychert	Massey University	Harm reduction industries or harmful corporations? Investigating digital and social media influence strategies of the emerging international legal cannabis industry and cannabis vaping sector
2023	Emma Sharp	University of Auckland	Aotearoa New Zealand's diverse soil values: Examining the ontological politics of soil 'management' from the ground up

Source: Royal Society Te Apārangi
