= Karen Stockin =

New Zealand marine biologist

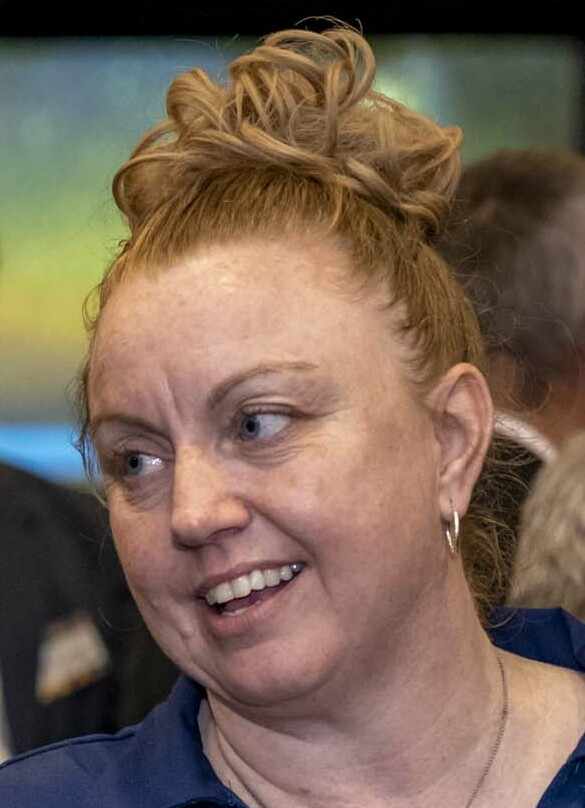
- Stockin in 2023
- Born: Karen Ann Stockin
- Education: University of Plymouth; Massey University
- Scientific career
- Fields: Marine Mammalogist, Marine Biology
- Workplaces: Massey University
- Thesis: The New Zealand common dolphin (Delphinus sp.) : identity, ecology and conservation (2008)
- Doctoral advisor: Mark Orams

Karen Ann Stockin is a New Zealand academic marine ecologist, and as of 2021 is a full professor at Massey University and a Rutherford Discovery Fellow for Royal Society Te Apārangi (New Zealand). Her research focuses on animal welfare and the impacts of human activities on cetacean populations, including tourism effects, and persistent marine contaminants.

== Academic career ==
Stockin obtained a Bachelors of Science (Honours) from the University of Plymouth, and a Masters of Science as a European Union Scholar from the University of Aberdeen. She completed her PhD as a Commonwealth Scholar at Massey University in 2008, with a thesis titled "The New Zealand common dolphin (Delphinus sp.): identity, ecology and conservation", supervised by Mark Orams.

Stockin was the inaugural strandings coordinator for the International Whaling Commission, and serves on the IWC Strandings Initiative Expert Panel.

== Recognition ==
In 2005, Stockin was awarded a Hutton Award by the Royal Society Te Apārangi.

In 2018, Stockin received a Rutherford Discovery Fellowship for a project title "The application of artificial intelligence (AI), innovative technologies and evolutionary theory to address the conservation-welfare nexus during human-wildlife interactions". She was also made the inaugural Bob Kerridge Animal Welfare Fellow in the same year.

== Selected works ==
- Stockin, Karen (2008). The New Zealand common dolphin (Delphinus sp.) : identity, ecology and conservation (Doctor of Philosophy thesis). Massey University. Wikidata Q106666293.
- Anna M Meissner; Christiansen, Fredrik; Emmanuelle Martinez; Matthew D M Pawley; Mark B Orams; Stockin, Karen (2015). "Behavioural effects of tourism on oceanic common dolphins, Delphinus sp., in New Zealand: the effects of Markov analysis variations and current tour operator compliance with regulations". PLOS One. 10 (1) e0116962. Bibcode:2015PLoSO..1016962M. doi:10.1371/journal.pone.0116962. PMC 4286237. PMID 25565523. Wikidata Q30421049.
- Amaral, Ana; Luciano B Beheregaray; Kerstin Bilgmann; et al. (2012). "Seascape genetics of a globally distributed, highly mobile marine mammal: the short-beaked common dolphin (genus Delphinus)". PLOS One. 7 (2) e31482. Bibcode:2012PLoSO...731482A. doi:10.1371/journal.pone.0031482. PMC 3271111. PMID 22319634. Wikidata Q34154845.
- Amaral, Ana; Luciano B Beheregaray; Kerstin Bilgmann; et al. (2012). "Influences of past climatic changes on historical population structure and demography of a cosmopolitan marine predator, the common dolphin (genus Delphinus)". Molecular Ecology. 21 (19): 4854–4871. doi:10.1111/j.1365-294x.2012.05728.x. PMID 22891814. Wikidata Q34293967.
- Stockin, Karen; R J Law; Roe, Wendi Dianne; L Meynier; E Martinez; P J Duignan; P Bridgen; B Jones (2010). "PCBs and organochlorine pesticides in Hector's (Cephalorhynchus hectori hectori) and Maui's (Cephalorhynchus hectori maui) dolphins". Marine Pollution Bulletin. 60 (6): 834–842. doi:10.1016/j.marpolbul.2010.01.009. PMID 20226477. Wikidata Q43131233.
