= Keren Dittmer =

Veterinary pathologist

Academic background
- Education: Massey University, Massey University
- Thesis: Inherited rickets in Corriedale sheep (2008)
- Doctoral advisor: Keith Gordon Thompson, Laryssa Howe, Hugh Thomas Blair, Kathryn Stowell

Keren Elizabeth Dittmer is a New Zealand academic, and is professor of veterinary pathology at Massey University, specialising in animal skeletal pathology, vitamin D, and genetic diseases.

== Academic career ==
Dittmer holds a Bachelor of Veterinary Science from Massey University, and also completed a PhD at the same university in 2008. Her doctoral thesis investigated inherited rickets in Corriedale sheep. Dittmer then joined the faculty of Massey, rising to full professor in 2023.

Dittmer's research focuses on bone diseases in animals, vitamin D deficiency and genetic diseases. Dittmer has researched the cause of humeral fractures in dairy heifers. She has also conducted research into dropped hock syndrome in cattle, and the repurposing of older drugs for squamous cell cancer treatment in cats and dogs.

Dittmer is a Fellow of the Higher Education Academy, qualified as a diplomate of the American College of Veterinary Pathologists in 2011, and as of 2024 is the president of the New Zealand Society for Veterinary Pathology.

Dittmer has written chapters in seven text books, including two of the main veterinary pathology reference texts, on bone pathology and bone tumours. She also authored an update of the WHO classification of bone and cartilage tumours.

== Awards and honours ==
Dittmer is part of the Variant Discovery Team, which won the Hill Lab Primary Industries award at the Kudos Awards in December 2023. The Kudos Awards "honour educators, scientists and innovators who have embraced technology as a catalyst for progress". She was also part of a veterinary pathology teaching team that won a teaching award.

== Selected works ==
- K E Dittmer; K G Thompson (2010). "Vitamin D metabolism and rickets in domestic animals: a review". Veterinary Pathology. 48 (2): 389–407. doi:10.1177/0300985810375240. PMID 20634407. Wikidata Q37773108.
- Xia Zhao; Dittmer, Keren Elizabeth; Hugh T Blair; Keith G Thompson; Rothschild, Max Frederick; Garrick, Dorian (2011). "A novel nonsense mutation in the DMP1 gene identified by a genome-wide association study is responsible for inherited rickets in Corriedale sheep". PLOS One. 6 (7) e21739. Bibcode:2011PLoSO...621739Z. doi:10.1371/journal.pone.0021739. PMC 3128599. PMID 21747952. Wikidata Q33958077.
- Jenkins, Kathryn S.; Dittmer, Keren Elizabeth; Marshall, Jonathan Craig; Séverine Tasker (2013). "Prevalence and risk factor analysis of feline haemoplasma infection in New Zealand domestic cats using a real-time PCR assay". Journal of Feline Medicine and Surgery. 15 (12): 1063–1069. doi:10.1177/1098612x13488384. PMID 23666110. Wikidata Q51874885.
- Roe, Wendi Dianne; L Rogers; K Pinpimai; Dittmer, Keren Elizabeth; J Marshall; Chilvers, Barbara Louise (2015). "Septicaemia and meningitis caused by infection of New Zealand sea lion pups with a hypermucoviscous strain of Klebsiella pneumoniae". Veterinary Microbiology. 176 (3–4): 301–308. doi:10.1016/j.vetmic.2015.01.019. PMID 25682024. Wikidata Q41483267.
- Leonardo Murgiano; Vidhya Jagannathan; Benazzi, Cinzia; Marilena Bolcato; Brunetti, Barbara; Luisa Vera Muscatello; Dittmer, Keren Elizabeth; Christian Piffer; Arcangelo Gentile; Drögemüller, Cord (2014). "Deletion in the EVC2 gene causes chondrodysplastic dwarfism in Tyrolean Grey cattle". PLOS One. 9 (4) e94861. Bibcode:2014PLoSO...994861M. doi:10.1371/journal.pone.0094861. PMC 3986253. PMID 24733244. Wikidata Q27340080.
- Dittmer, Keren Elizabeth; K G Thompson (2015). "Approach to Investigating Congenital Skeletal Abnormalities in Livestock". Veterinary Pathology. 52 (5): 851–861. doi:10.1177/0300985815579999. PMID 25910781. Wikidata Q38441035.
