= Michelle LaRue =

American conservation biologist and ecologist

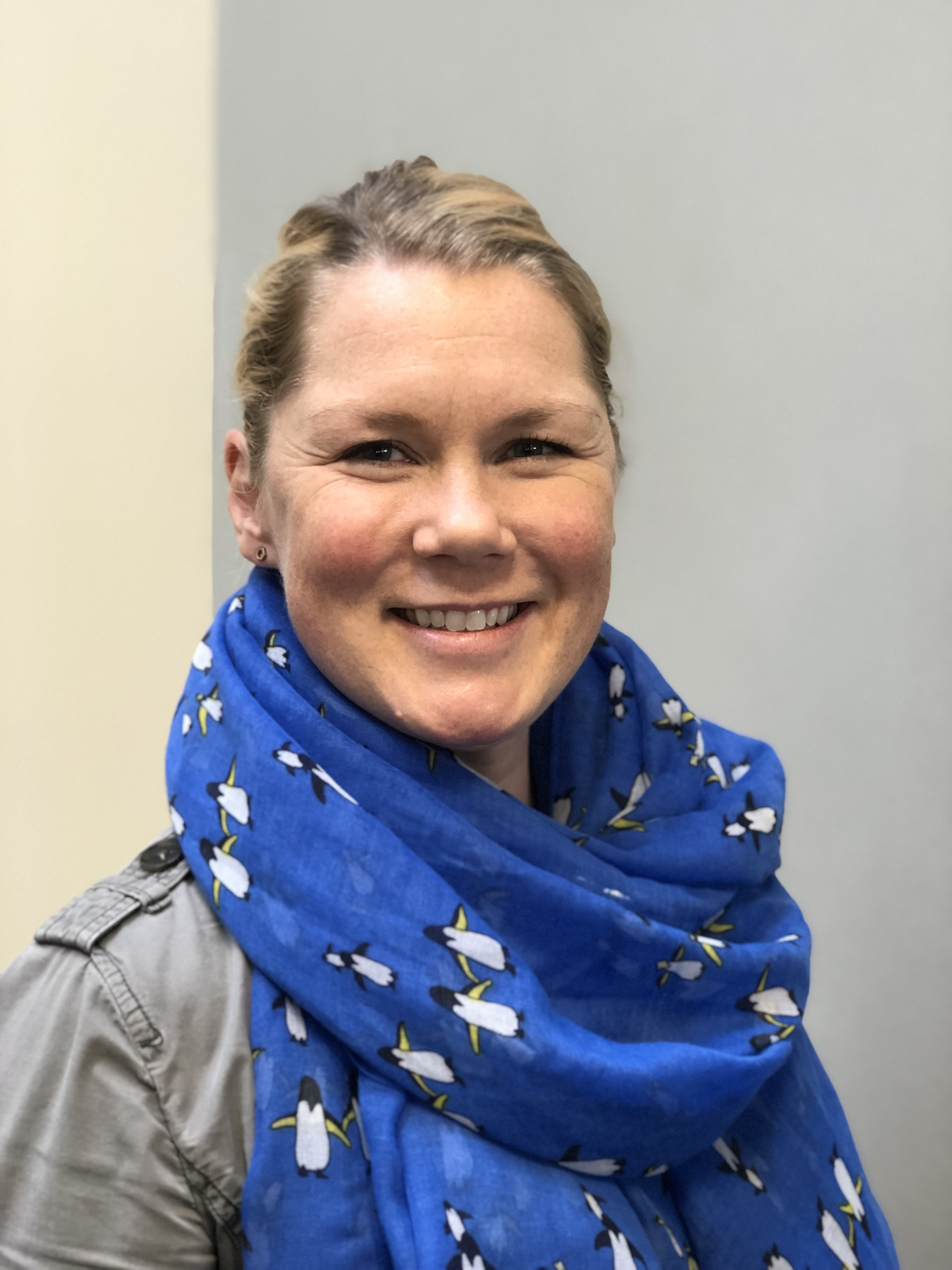
- Scientific career
- Fields: Ecologist; Conservation Biologist
- Workplaces: University of Canterbury

Michelle La Rue is a conservation biologist and ecologist based at the University of Canterbury in Christchurch, New Zealand.

Her research focuses on using satellite imagery to understand polar animals, including emperor penguins and crabeater seals. She has visited Antarctica at least six times.

== Education ==
LaRue started her scientific career at Minnesota State University, Mankato where she completed a Bachelor of Science majoring in ecology. This involved researching the food habits of hoary bats by dissecting and identifying the remains of insects in their guano. She also completed modelling of white-tail deer populations using distance sampling techniques.

She went on to gain a master's degree in zoology at Southern Illinois University Carbondale where she studied the habitat and dispersal of cougars.

LaRue has a doctorate in Conservation Biology from the University of Minnesota. This saw her use high-resolution satellite imagery to study the population dynamics, biogeography, and threats to polar animals.

In December 2025 she was appointed as a full professor at the University of Canterbury.

== Awards and honours ==
In 2022 LaRue received a Rutherford Discovery Fellowship to study populations of crabeater seals, Weddell seals, emperor penguins, and Adélie penguins in Antarctica.
