= Dittmer =

Dittmer may refer to:

== People ==
- Andreas Dittmer (born 1972), German sprint canoeist
- Anja Dittmer (born 1975), German triathlete
- Erica Dittmer (born 1991), American-born Mexican swimmer
- Felix Dittmer (1904–1977), Australian politician
- Jack Dittmer (1928–2014), American baseball player
- John Dittmer (born 1939), American historian
- Keren Dittmer, New Zealand professor of veterinary pathology
- Lowell Dittmer (1942–2024), American author and professor
- Mads Dittmer Hvilsom (born 1992), Danish footballer

== Places ==
- Dittmer, Queensland, a locality in the Whitsunday Region, Queensland, Australia

== See also ==
- Dittmar
