= Harry Smith (botanist) =

British botanist (1935–2015)

Harry Smith FRS
- Born: 19 September 1935
- Died: 9 February 2015 (aged 79)
- Education: University of Manchester; University of Wales
- Known for: Photomorphogenesis
- Spouse: Elinor
- Children: Siân, Caroline, Michael
- Scientific career
- Fields: Botany
- Workplaces: University of London; University of Manchester; University of Nottingham; University of Leicester
- Academic advisors: Arthur Galston

Harry Smith FRS (19 September 1935 – 9 February 2015) was a British botanist. Smith is best known for his discovery that phytochromes can detect changes in the colour that plants receive (e.g., because of shading from neighbouring plants), which allows them to adjust their growth rates accordingly.

Smith was the founding editor of the academic journal Molecular Ecology, and its managing editor from 1992 to 2008. He was also the founding editor of the journals Molecular Ecology Resources, Global Change Biology, and Plant, Cell & Environment.

In 2000, Smith was elected as a Fellow of the Royal Society (FRS).
