= Alana Alexander =

Bioinformatician at the University of Otago

- Education: Oregon State University
- Scientific career
- Fields: Bioinformatics
- Workplaces: University of Otago
- Thesis: The influence of social structure and molecular evolution on genetic diversity in the sperm whale (Physeter macrocephalus) (2014)
- Doctoral advisor: C. Scott Baker

Alana Alexander (Ngāpuhi, Te Hikutu) is a New Zealand bioinformatician at the University of Otago. In 2021, she was awarded a Rutherford Discovery Fellowship to investigate the past impacts of fisheries on Hector's and Māui dolphins, and use genomics to inform models of the future effects of climate change on whales and dolphins.

== Education ==
Alexander completed a PhD in Wildlife Science at Oregon State University in 2014, with a thesis titled The influence of social structure and molecular evolution on genetic diversity in the sperm whale (Physeter macrocephalus), supervised by Scott Baker.

== Research career ==
Following her PhD, Alexander undertook postdoctoral work at the University of Kansas, working on sperm whales. Her research showed that there was a "sperm whale Eve", from whom all other sperm whales are descended, about 80,000 years ago. Following this she returned to New Zealand for a postdoctoral position in Neil Gemmell's laboratory in the Department of Anatomy at the University of Otago. Part of her project explored the genetics of barking in huntaways. Following this, Alexander attained a Rutherford Postdoctoral Fellowship to work on hologenomes, where the genomes of an organism and the microbes it hosts are considered together. In November 2021 Alexander won a Rutherford Discovery Fellowship to use genomics to investigate the impacts of fisheries on Hector's and Maui dolphins in the past, and to predict climate change impacts on whale and dolphin populations. Alexander plans to work with hapū to co-develop "science pūrākau" (which translates literally as "science stories") to create inspirational narratives to support people who have kaitiakitanga and rangatiratanga over taonga (treasured) species. The Fellowship is worth $800,000 over five years.

Alexander and a student are also undertaking pest-control research funded by Predator Free 2050, looking at how understanding genes involved in possum reproduction could help New Zealand meet its predator control targets, and what social licence might be needed for gene drives to be used in predator control in a culturally-informed way.

== Recognition ==
Alexander was received the 2020 New Supervisor of the Year Award by the Otago University Students' Association. She has also received a University of Otago Kaupapa Māori award, and a Fulbright Science and Technology Award.

== Selected publications ==
- Carroll, Emma; Patenaude, N; Alexander, Alana M.; et al. (2011). "Population structure and individual movement of southern right whales around New Zealand and Australia". Marine Ecology Progress Series. 432: 257–268. doi:10.3354/meps09145. Wikidata Q58493804.
- Alexander, Alana M.; Steel, Debbie; Hoekzema, Kendra; Mesnick, Sarah; Engelhaupt, Daniel; Kerr, Iain; Payne, Roger Searle; Baker, Scott (2016). "What influences the worldwide genetic structure of sperm whales (Physeter macrocephalus)?". Molecular Ecology. 25 (12): 2754–2772. doi:10.1111/mec.13638. PMID 27037911. Wikidata Q35977599.
- Baca, Stephen; Alexander, Alana M.; Gustafson, Grey; Short, Andrew (2017). "Ultraconserved elements show utility in phylogenetic inference of Adephaga (Coleoptera) and suggest paraphyly of 'Hydradephaga'". Systematic Entomology. 42 (4): 786–795. doi:10.1111/syen.12244. Wikidata Q58493792.
- Alexander, Alana M.; Dutoit, Ludovic (2020). "Roe deer on ice: selection despite limited effective population size through the Pleistocene". Molecular Ecology. doi:10.1111/mec.15511. PMID 32564462. Wikidata Q96618037.
