= Jodie Hunter =

New Zealand education researcher

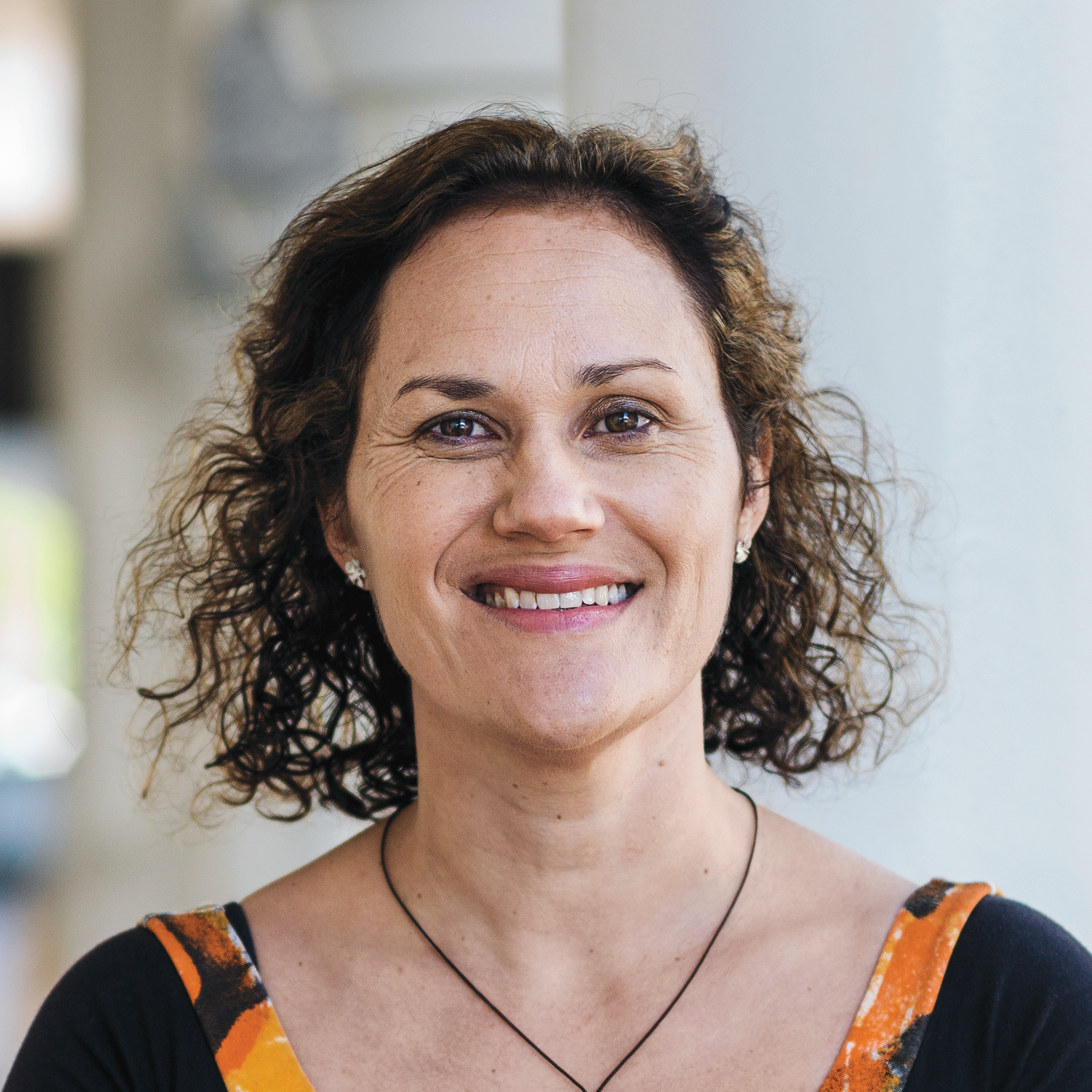
- Hunter in 2018
- Awards: Fulbright Scholarship; Rutherford Discovery Fellowship

Academic background
- Education: Massey University; University of Plymouth
- Thesis: Developing early algebraic reasoning in a mathematical community of inquiry (2013)
- Doctoral advisor: David Burghes
- Other advisors: Glenda Anthony; Ngaire Davies

Jodie Margaret Roberta Hunter is a New Zealand academic, of Cook Island Māori descent, and is a full professor at Massey University. Hunter researches mathematics pedagogy, with a particular interest in culturally responsive teaching of mathematics to Pasifika students. She is a Rutherford Discovery Fellow and has been a Fulbright Scholar.

== Academic career ==
Hunter's mother is education researcher Bobbie Hunter. Hunter began her career as a primary school teacher, and completed a Master of Education at Massey University in 2007, on algebraic understanding in inquiry classrooms, supervised by Glenda Anthony and Ngaire Davies. She then gained a PhD at the University of Plymouth, supervised by Professor David Burghes. Hunter's interests are in early algebraic reasoning, funds of knowledge, and equity in education.

Hunter was awarded a Fulbright Scholarship to study equity in mathematics education at the University of Arizona. In 2019 she was awarded a Rutherford Discovery Fellowship to research culturally responsive mathematics education in New Zealand, Cook Islands and Niuean schools. She is a principal investigator of the Te Pūnaha Matatini Centre of Research Excellence. Hunter was appointed by the Minister of Education to the board of the New Zealand Council for Educational Research in 2018 for a four-year term.

Hunter received a Massey University Defining Excellence Early Career Researcher award in 2016 and Mathematics Education Research Group of Australasia Research Team Award in 2018. She was promoted to full professor from 1 January 2023.

== Selected works ==
- Jodie Hunter; Jodie Miller (2020). "Using a Culturally Responsive Approach to Develop Early Algebraic Reasoning with Young Diverse Learners". International Journal of Science and Mathematics Education. 20 (1): 111–131. doi:10.1007/s10763-020-10135-0. Wikidata Q115927868.
- Anthony, Glenda Joy; Roberta Hunter; Jodie Hunter (2017). "Challenging teachers' perceptions of student capability through professional development: a telling case". Journal of In-Service Education. 44 (5): 650–662. doi:10.1080/19415257.2017.1387868. Wikidata Q98205918.
- Roberta Hunter; Jodie Hunter; Anthony, Glenda Joy; Katrina McChesney (2018). "Developing mathematical inquiry communities: Enacting culturally responsive, culturally sustaining, ambitious mathematics teaching". set Research Information for Teachers (2): 25. doi:10.18296/set.0106. Wikidata Q99725532.
- Anthony, Glenda Joy; Jodie Hunter; Roberta Hunter (2015). "Prospective teachers development of adaptive expertise". Teaching and Teacher Education. 49: 108–117. doi:10.1016/j.tate.2015.03.010. Wikidata Q60494212.
