= Amanda Black (soil chemist) =

Soil health and biosecurity researcher

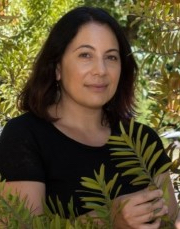
- Black in 2019
- Awards: Rutherford Fellowship (2021)

Academic background
- Education: Lincoln University
- Thesis: Bioavailability of cadmium, copper, nickel and zinc in soils treated with biosolids and metal salts (2010)
- Doctoral advisor: Ron McLaren, Suzie Reichman, Tom Speir, Leo Condron

Amanda Black is a New Zealand soil chemist who, as of 2023, is a full professor at Lincoln University. She specializes in soil health and biosecurity, and has worked on kauri dieback and integration of matauranga Māori into science.

== Early life and education ==
Black is of Tūhoe, Whakatōhea and Te Whanau a Āpanui descent. After earning a master's degree at the University of Otago, Black completed a PhD titled Bioavailability of cadmium, copper, nickel and zinc in soils treated with biosolids and metal salts at Lincoln University in 2010. Her work was supervised by Ron McLaren, Suzie Reichman, Tom Speir and Leo Condron.

== Academic career ==
Black joined the staff at Lincoln university, rising to full professor in 2022. In 2020, she was appointed co-director of the Bioprotection Aotearoa Centre of Research Excellence when it was refunded.

== Honours and awards ==
Black received a Māori Television Matariki Award — the Te Tupu-ā-Rangi for Health and Science — in 2019. She also received the Ministry for Primary Industries Biosecurity Award for Emerging Leader in 2018. In 2021, Black was awarded a Rutherford Discovery Fellowship for the project Genomes to giants: restoring resilient soil ecosystems in kauri forests. This project aimed "to reconstruct the kauri soil ecosystem using soil DNA and integrat[e] matauranga Māori of the ngāhere forest, to build whakapapa of the soil." In 2024, Black was awarded Lincoln University's 2024 Critic and Conscience Award.

== Selected works ==
- Black, Amanda; Gary Garner; Melanie Mark-Shadbolt; Jovana Balanovic; Edith MacDonald; Mercier, Ocean; Janine Wright (2021). "Indigenous peoples' attitudes and social acceptability of invasive species control in New Zealand". Pacific Conservation Biology. doi:10.1071/pc21049. Wikidata Q113281346.
- Black, Amanda; Melanie Mark-Shadbolt; Gary Garner; Jenny Green; Tame Malcolm; Alby Marsh; Hone Ropata; Nick Waipara; Waitangi Wood (2019). "How an Indigenous community responded to the incursion and spread of myrtle rust (Austropuccinia psidii) that threatens culturally significant plant species – a case study from New Zealand". Pacific Conservation Biology. 25 (4): 348. doi:10.1071/pc18052. Wikidata Q113281350.
- Alexa-Kate Byers; Condron, Leo M.; O'Callaghan, Maureen; Nick Waipara; Black, Amanda (2021). "Identification of Burkholderia and Penicillium isolates from kauri (Agathis australis) soils that inhibit the mycelial growth of Phytophthora agathidicida". New Zealand Plant Protection. 74 (1): 42–54. doi:10.30843/nzpp.2021.74.11736. Wikidata Q117306170.
- Bradshaw, Rosemary; S. E. Bellgard; Black, Amanda; et al. (2019). "Phytophthora agathidicida : research progress, cultural perspectives and knowledge gaps in the control and management of kauri dieback in New Zealand". Plant Pathology. 69 (1): 3–16. doi:10.1111/ppa.13104. Wikidata Q93002286.
