= Matthew Roskruge =

New Zealand researcher in health economics

- Born: New Zealand
- Awards: Rutherford Discovery Fellowship (2019)

Academic background
- Education: University of Waikato (BSocSci (Hons), PhD)
- Thesis: (2014)

Academic work
- Discipline: Economics
- Sub-discipline: Māori economics; social capital; regional development; health economics
- Institutions: Massey University

Matthew Roskruge is a Māori economist from New Zealand. He is Associate Dean Māori and a professor in the School of Economics and Finance at Massey University, and directs Te Au Rangahau, the university's Māori business research centre. In 2019, he received a five-year Rutherford Discovery Fellowship for a research programme titled "The economics of social capital from a Māori perspective."

== Early life and education ==
Roskruge affiliates to the Iwi of Te Āti Awa and Ngāti Tama. He completed a Bachelor of Social Science with honours at the University of Waikato in 2011 and a PhD in economics there in 2014.

== Career ==
After a brief period in the New Zealand public service, Roskruge became a research fellow at the National Institute of Demographic and Economic Analysis (NIDEA) at Waikato. He joined Massey University in 2016, rising to director of Te Au Rangahau and, following the 2022 promotions round, full professor effective 1 January 2024. Since 2023, he has served as Associate Dean Māori for the Massey Business School.

Trained in applied econometrics, Roskruge's work explores social capital, labour and regional economics, health economics and Māori economic development. His Rutherford Fellowship investigates how mātauranga Māori can reshape social-capital theory to improve economic and social outcomes for Māori communities. He frequently comments in the media on indigenous economic policy; for example, he critiqued the lack of targeted Māori funding in the 2025 New Zealand budget.

=== Selected publications ===
- Roskruge, Matthew; Poot, Jacques (2025). "Evidence of the effects of ethnic diversity, years of residence, and location on migrant bridging, bonding and linking social capital: a New Zealand synthesis". Asia Pacific Journal of Regional Science. 9 (1): 1–22. doi:10.1007/s41685-024-00397-9 (inactive 25 July 2025).
- Cameron, Michael P.; Miller, Peter G.; Roskruge, Matthew (2022). "Side-loading prevalence and intoxication in the night-time economy". Addictive Behaviors Reports. 15 100432. doi:10.1016/j.abrep.2022.100432. PMC 9121183. PMID 35600227.
- Cochrane, William; Poot, Jacques; Roskruge, Matthew (2023). "Urban resilience and social security uptake: New Zealand evidence from the Global Financial Crisis and the COVID-19 pandemic". Australasian Journal of Regional Studies. 29 (2): 155–184.

== Awards and honours ==
- 2019 – Rutherford Discovery Fellowship, Royal Society Te Apārangi.
- 2020–2026 – Principal Investigator, MBIE-funded project "Social Capital in Aotearoa."
