= Glenda Anthony =

New Zealand mathematician and academic

- Other name: Glenda Joy Anthony
- Education: Massey University
- Awards: MERGA career research medal
- Scientific career
- Fields: mathematics pedagogy
- Workplaces: Massey University
- Thesis: Learning strategies in mathematics education (1994)
- Academic advisors: Gordon Knight, Alison St George
- Notable students: Jodie Hunter

Glenda Joy Anthony is a New Zealand mathematician and academic who is a full professor at Massey University.

== Academic career ==
After a master's degree and a PhD 'Learning strategies in mathematics education' at Massey University, Anthony joined the staff at Massey and rose to be full professor in 2010.

Anthony's research focuses on finding new ways to teach mathematics, including moving away from ability groups and peer teaching.

In 2013, Anthony was the first New Zealand recipient of the MERGA career research medal.

Mathematics education professor Jodie Hunter was a student of Anthony's.

== Selected works ==
- Walshaw, Margaret, and Glenda Anthony. "The teacher’s role in classroom discourse: A review of recent research into mathematics classrooms." Review of educational research 78, no. 3 (2008): 516–551.
- Anthony, G., and M. Walshaw. "Effective pedagogy in Pāngarau/Mathematics: Best evidence synthesis iteration (BES)." (2007).
- Anthony, Glenda, and Margaret Walshaw. "Characteristics of effective teaching of mathematics: A view from the West." Journal of Mathematics Education 2, no. 2 (2009): 147–164.
- Anthony, Glenda. "Active learning in a constructivist framework." Educational studies in mathematics 31, no. 4 (1996): 349–369.
- Anthony, Glenda. "Factors influencing first-year students' success in mathematics." International Journal of Mathematical Education in Science and Technology 31, no. 1 (2000): 3–14.
