= Jenni Stanley =

New Zealand marine bio-acoustician

- Citizenship: New Zealand
- Education: University of Auckland (BSc, PhD)
- Known for: Research on underwater soundscapes and their influence on marine organisms
- Awards: Rutherford Discovery Fellowship (2019)
- Scientific career
- Fields: Marine science; underwater acoustics
- Workplaces: University of Waikato, NOAA, Woods Hole Oceanographic Institution
- Thesis: (2011)

Jenni A. Stanley is a New Zealand marine scientist and bio-acoustician who investigates how natural and human-made sounds shape marine ecosystems. She is a senior lecturer in marine science and aquaculture at the University of Waikato, where her work focuses on measuring and interpreting underwater soundscapes and their ecological significance.

== Education ==
Stanley grew up at Piha on Auckland’s west coast and earned a BSc in biological science (marine science) at the University of Auckland. She began a master’s project at the university’s Leigh Marine Laboratory that was upgraded to a PhD, which she completed in 2011.

== Career ==
After her doctorate, Stanley spent two years as a research fellow at the University of Auckland’s Institute of Marine Science before moving to the United States in 2015. She worked as a research scientist with NOAA’s Northeast Fisheries Science Center and Stellwagen Bank National Marine Sanctuary, and later as a research associate at the Woods Hole Oceanographic Institution.

In 2019 she returned to New Zealand after winning a five-year Rutherford Discovery Fellowship to investigate "What does protection sound like? A modern approach to understanding New Zealand’s underwater soundscapes and acoustic pressures", establishing a research programme that combines autonomous acoustic recorders, visual surveys and machine-learning tools.

Stanley now leads projects on coastal soundscapes around New Zealand and serves on international panels developing global bioacoustic data resources, including the Global Library of Underwater Biological Sounds (GLUBS).

== Awards ==
- Rutherford Discovery Fellowship, Royal Society Te Apārangi (2019)

== Selected works ==
- Stanley J.A., Van Parijs S.M. & Hatch L.T. (2017). “Underwater sound from vessel traffic reduces the effective communication range in Atlantic cod and haddock.” Scientific Reports 7: 14633.
- Stanley J.A. et al. (2022). “Sounding the Call for a Global Library of Underwater Biological Sounds.” Frontiers in Ecology and Evolution 10: 810156.
- Stanley J.A. et al. (2021). “Monitoring spatial and temporal underwater soundscape features within four U.S. National Marine Sanctuaries.” NOAA Technical Report.
