= Jennifer Hay =

Professor of linguistics

Jennifer Hay FRSNZ
- Education: Weinberg College of Arts and Sciences
- Awards: Rutherford Discovery Fellowship, James Cook Research Fellowship
- Scientific career
- Fields: phonetics, sociolinguistics, laboratory phonology, New Zealand English
- Workplaces: University of Canterbury

Jennifer Bohun Hay FRSNZ is a New Zealand linguist who specialises in sociolinguistics, laboratory phonology, and the history of New Zealand English. As of 2020 she is a full professor at the University of Canterbury.

== Academic career ==
In 2000, Hay gained a PhD titled Causes and Consequences of Word Structure at Northwestern University in Illinois in the Linguistics department. She moved to the University of Canterbury, and was appointed a full professor in 2010.

Hay's research has revealed that a New Zealand dialect took only a single generation to emerge. She has explored how speech perception and production is influenced by past experiences and current context, including environmental factors: for example, New Zealanders hear vowels differently if they are in a room with toy kangaroos and koalas as opposed to toy kiwi.

Hay is the director of the New Zealand Institute of Language, Brain and Behaviour, a multi-disciplinary research centre based at the University of Canterbury. In 2015 she was awarded a James Cook Research Fellowship to research on how personal experience shapes the New Zealand accent and word use.

In 2017, Hay was featured in the Royal Society Te Apārangi's 150 women in 150 words project, celebrating the contributions of women to knowledge in New Zealand.

== Awards ==
Hay received a Rutherford Discovery Fellowship in 2011, a James Cook Research Fellowship and a University of Canterbury Research Award in 2015, and was made a Fellow of the Royal Society Te Apārangi in 2015.

== Selected articles ==
- Jennifer Hay; Aaron Nolan; Katie Drager (1 January 2006). "From fush to feesh: Exemplar priming in speech perception". The Linguistic Review. 23 (3). doi:10.1515/tlr.2006.014. ISSN 0167-6318. Wikidata Q104451332.
- Jennifer Hay; Katie Drager; Paul Warren (29 April 2009). "Careful Who You Talk to: An Effect of Experimenter Identity on the Production of the NEAR/SQUARE Merger in New Zealand English". Australian Journal of Linguistics. 29 (2): 269–285. doi:10.1080/07268600902823128. ISSN 0726-8602. Wikidata Q57707500.
- Márton Sóskuthy; Jennifer Hay (5 June 2017). "Changing word usage predicts changing word durations in New Zealand English". Cognition. 166: 298–313. doi:10.1016/j.cognition.2017.05.032. ISSN 0010-0277. PMID 28595142. Wikidata Q50594835.
- Jennifer Hay (2 March 2018). "Sociophonetics: The Role of Words, the Role of Context, and the Role of Words in Context". Topics in Cognitive Science. doi:10.1111/tops.12326. ISSN 1756-8765. PMID 29498479. Wikidata Q50421187.
- Jennifer Hay; Abby Walker; Kauyumari Sanchez; Kirsty Thompson (4 February 2019). "Abstract social categories facilitate access to socially skewed words". PLOS One. 14 (2) e0210793. doi:10.1371/journal.pone.0210793. ISSN 1932-6203. PMC 6361498. PMID 30716075. Wikidata Q61800437.
- Jennifer Hay; Katie Drager (September 2007). "Sociophonetics". Annual Review of Anthropology. 36 (1): 89–103. doi:10.1146/annurev.anthro.34.081804.120633. ISSN 0084-6570. Wikidata Q60333707.
- Jennifer Hay; Katie Drager (January 2010). "Stuffed toys and speech perception". Linguistics. 48 (4). doi:10.1515/ling.2010.027. ISSN 0024-3949. Wikidata Q104451326.

== Authored books ==
- Jennifer Hay; Margaret Maclagan; Elizabeth Gordon (2008), New Zealand English, Edinburgh: Edinburgh University Press, OL 16920120W, Wikidata Q104451436
- Elizabeth Gordon; Lyle Campbell; Jennifer Hay; Margaret Maclagan; Andrea Sudbury; Peter Trudgill (20 May 2004). New Zealand English: Its Origins and Evolution. Cambridge University Press. doi:10.1017/cbo9780511486678. ISBN 978-0-511-48667-8. Wikidata Q104519090.
- Rens Bod, Jennifer Hay, and Stefanie Jannedy. Probabilistic Linguistics. 2003. MIT Press.
