= Damian Scarf =

New Zealand developmental psychologist

- Born: 1983
- Died: 18 December 2024; Dunedin, New Zealand
- Citizenship: New Zealand
- Education: University of Otago (BSc, PhD)
- Known for: Serial-order learning in animals; positive youth development research
- Scientific career
- Fields: Developmental psychology; comparative cognition
- Workplaces: University of Otago
- Thesis: Representation of serial order in pigeons (Columba livia) (2011)

Damian Kieron Scarf (1983 – 18 December 2024) was a New Zealand psychologist and associate professor in the Department of Psychology at the University of Otago. He combined work in comparative cognition with studies of adolescent behaviour and was noted for mentoring Māori and Pasifika students.

== Early life and education ==
Scarf originally studied zoology at the University of Otago, then completed a PhD in psychology in 2011 that examined how pigeons represent and plan serial order. His dissertation was later placed on the Division of Sciences list of "exceptional theses". During his doctorate, he received a Fulbright scholarship and spent a year at Columbia University's Primate Cognition Laboratory as a visiting researcher.

== Academic career ==
After a post-doctoral fellowship in child development, Scarf joined Otago’s psychology department as a lecturer in 2013 and was promoted to Associate Professor. He directed the Adolescent Behaviour and Child Development (ABCD) Lab and taught papers on adolescent behaviour and child development.

Scarf was awarded a Rutherford Discovery Fellowship in 2019 for ‘‘The Belonging Project’’, which investigated how group identification supports mental health. Scarf’s early comparative work showed that pigeons and other animals could plan action sequences and even recognise written words. A 2016 paper in Proceedings of the National Academy of Sciences demonstrated orthographic processing in pigeons.

Later projects focused on the "social cure" and positive youth development, exploring how group belonging buffers students from anxiety, alcohol harm and loneliness.

== Death and legacy ==
Scarf died suddenly in Dunedin on 18 December 2024, aged 41. Colleagues said his death "left a huge hole" in the department, noting both his prolific scholarship and his advocacy for his students.

== Selected works ==
- Scarf D. et al. "Orthographic processing in pigeons (Columba livia)." PNAS 113 (40): 11272–11276 (2016).
- Scarf D.; Colombo M. "Representation of serial order in pigeons." Journal of Experimental Psychology: Animal Behavior Processes 36 (2010): 423–429.
- Riordan B.C. et al. "Fear of missing out and alcohol use during events." Drug & Alcohol Review 38 Suppl 1 (2019): S88–S89.
