= Jessica Lai =

New Zealand law professor

- Born: 1985
- Awards: Rutherford Discovery Fellowship

Academic background
- Education: Victoria University of Wellington, University of Lucerne, Victoria University of Wellington
- Thesis: The Use of Nanostructured Calcium Silicate in Solar Cells (2009)
- Academic advisors: Thomas Borrmann, Michael J Richardson

Jessica Christine Lai is a New Zealand academic, and is a full professor at Victoria University of Wellington, specialising in the interaction of intellectual property rights and indigenous knowledge.

== Academic career ==
Lai is trained as a chemist, having completed a Master of Science in 2009 in chemistry with a thesis titled The Use of Nanostructured Calcium Silicate in Solar Cells at the Victoria University of Wellington. Lai completed her Doctor of Law in 2013 at the University of Lucerne, where she also conducted postdoctoral research. Lai was awarded a Swiss National Science Foundation Postdoctoral Fellowship to work at the Max-Planck Institute for Innovation and Competition in Munich. Lai then returned to New Zealand to join the faculty of the School of Accounting and Commercial Law at Victoria University of Wellington, rising to full professor.

Lai's research focuses on the interaction between Western intellectual property systems and indigenous knowledge, specifically Mātauranga Māori. She has investigated how the patenting system addresses problematic technologies such as a gene-related technology, and also examines law and feminism, knowledge theorisation and legal sociology. Lai has written publicly about issues such as country of origin labelling, the difference between a trade mark and a certification mark in regards to the 'Rainbow tick', and differences between men and women in STEM.

In 2018 Lai and colleague Susie Frankel were awarded a Marsden grant on "Mission Creep” in the Pharmaceutical Industry and its Impact on Innovation and Health. In 2021, Lai was awarded a Rutherford Discovery Fellowship for a project titled Patents and power: a critical analysis of knowledge governance.

== Selected works ==
=== Authored and edited books ===
- Lai, Jessica C. (2022). Indigenous Cultural Heritage and Intellectual Property Rights: Learning from the New Zealand Experience?. Springer Cham (published 8 January 2014). p. 331. doi:10.1007/978-3-319-02955-9. ISBN 978-3-319-02955-9.
- Graber, Christoph Beat; Kuprecht, Karolina; Lai, Jessica Christine, eds. (30 November 2012). International Trade in Indigenous Cultural Heritage: Legal and Policy Issues. ElgarOnline. ISBN 9780857938305.
- Lai, Jessica C. (2022). Patent Law and Women Tackling Gender Bias in Knowledge Governance. Routledge. ISBN 9781032079578.
- Frankel, Susie; Lai, Jessica C. (1 October 2016). Patent Law and Policy. LexisNexis. ISBN 9781927183830.

=== Journal articles ===
- Jessica C. Lai (2015). "Myriad Genetics and the BRCA Patents in Europe: The Implications of the U.S. Supreme Court Decision". UC Irvine Law Review. 5: 1041. Wikidata Q125876491.
- Jessica C Lai (2020). "The Role of Patents as a Gendered Chameleon". Social & Legal Studies. 30 (2): 203–229. doi:10.1177/0964663920916237. Wikidata Q125875560.
- Jessica Christine Lai (2010). "Māori Culture in the Modern World: Its Creation, Appropriation and Trade". SSRN. doi:10.2139/ssrn.1961482. Wikidata Q125876540.
- Vikas Kathuria; Jessica C. Lai (2018). "User review portability: Why and how?". Computer Law & Security Review. 34 (6): 1291–1299. doi:10.1016/j.clsr.2018.05.018. Wikidata Q115087703.
