= Margaret Walshaw =

New Zealand education academic

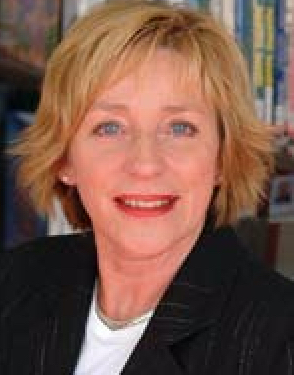
- Walshaw in 2007
- Education: Massey University
- Scientific career
- Fields: Mathematics education
- Workplaces: Massey University
- Thesis: Paradox, partiality and promise : a politics for girls in school mathematics (1999)

Margaret Anne Walshaw is a New Zealand education academic. She is currently a full professor at the Massey University.

== Academic career ==
Walshaw completed a 1999 PhD titled Paradox, partiality and promise : a politics for girls in school mathematics at Massey University and is on the editorial board of Springer journal, Journal of Mathematics Teacher Education.

== Selected works ==
- Walshaw, Margaret, and Glenda Anthony. "The teacher’s role in classroom discourse: A review of recent research into mathematics classrooms." Review of educational research, 78, no. 3 (2008): 516–551.
- Anthony, Glenda, and Margaret Walshaw. "Characteristics of effective teaching of mathematics: A view from the West." Journal of Mathematics Education, volume. 2 (2009): 147–164.
- Walshaw, Margaret. Working with Foucault in education. Sense Publishers, 2007.
- Anthony, Glenda, and Margaret Walshaw. Effective pedagogy in mathematics. Vol. 19. Belley, France: International Academy of Education, 2009.
- Walshaw, Margaret, ed. Mathematics education within the postmodern. IAP, 2004.
