= Molecular Ecology (journal) =

Scientific journal

- Discipline: Molecular ecology
- Language: English
- Edited by: Loren Rieseberg

Publication details
- History: 1992–present
- Publisher: Wiley-Blackwell
- Frequency: Biweekly
- Impact factor: 4.9 (2022)

Standard abbreviations
- ISO 4: Mol. Ecol.

Indexing
- CODEN: MOECEO
- ISSN: 0962-1083 (print); 1365-294X (web)
- OCLC no.: 39265322

Links
- Journal homepage; Online access; Online archive

Molecular Ecology is a twice monthly scientific journal covering investigations that use molecular techniques to address questions in ecology, evolution, behavior, and conservation. It is published by Wiley-Blackwell. Its 2022 impact factor is 4.9. It was established in 1992 with Harry Smith as founding editor-in-chief, while Loren Rieseberg is the current editor.

== See also ==
- Molecular Ecology Resources
