= Libby Liggins =

New Zealand marine ecologist

Libby Liggins is a New Zealand evolutionary ecologist and an Associate Professor in the School of Biological Sciences at the University of Auckland, Auckland, New Zealand, as well as a research associate at Auckland Museum. Her research uses genetic and genomic data to explore the biogeography, population ecology, and biodiversity of marine organisms.

== Life and career ==
Liggins grew up in the Northland Region. She graduated from Victoria University of Wellington in 2005 with a Bachelor of Science, followed by a MSc exploring the population genetics of mainland New Zealand skinks and the Chatham Islands skink (Oligosoma nigriplantare). Liggins was a Blake Antarctic Ambassador in 2008, carrying out environmental monitoring on a wind farm project to supply electricity to Scott Base and McMurdo Station.

Liggins then completed a PhD at the University of Queensland in 2013 in Cynthia Riginos's lab, with Hugh Possingham, and Eric Treml as additional supervisors, using mitochondrial and microsatellite markers to study the colonisation and dispersal of marine fishes and echinoderms around coral reefs of Australia and the West Pacific. She was part of the 2013 Auckland Museum expedition to the Three Kings Islands. Liggins was a Graduate Fellow at the National Evolutionary Synthesis Center in Durham, North Carolina from March to August 2014, working with the "Advancing genetic diversity research in the Indian and Pacific Oceans" group. Liggins then moved to the Albany campus of Massey University to take up an Allan Wilson Centre postdoctoral fellowship for a year, afterwards becoming a lecturer in marine ecology. She won a Rutherford Foundation New Zealand postdoctoral fellowship in 2015 and became a Senior Lecturer in 2018. In 2020, Liggins received a five year Rutherford Discovery Fellowship to work on a project titled Tohu of change for Aotearoa New Zealand’s marine biodiversity, based at Massey University.

Liggins has spoken out against proposed cuts to science research at Massey University's Albany campus, in which 50 staff jobs were under threat, and some majors such as marine biology were to be discontinued.

== Research ==
Liggins was project coordinator for the Ira Moana – Genes of the Sea – Network, a collaborative researcher network and database project to advance marine genetic research in New Zealand. The 2018–2020 project aimed to create a comprehensive genetic database that collected and curated all the metadata from thousands of biological samples, involving over 85 researchers and 25 institutions. The database also allows metadata to be tagged with "Traditional Knowledge" notices, to signal that indigenous people have rights associated with the genetic data. In 2019, Liggins won the World Data System (WDS) Data Stewardship Award for her work on the project.

In 2020, Liggins and her colleagues discovered three new records of fish species not previously known from the Kermadec Islands Marine Reserve. The observations were captured in hundreds of hours of unused underwater footage recorded in 2015, from a wildlife documentary being filmed while Liggins and her colleagues were on an expedition to the Kermadecs to collect DNA samples.

== Selected works ==
- Liggins, Libby; Treml, Eric A.; Riginos, Cynthia (2019), "Seascape Genomics: Contextualizing Adaptive and Neutral Genomic Variation in the Ocean Environment", in Oleksiak, MF; Rajora, OM (eds.), Population Genomics vol. Marine Organisms, Springer Nature, pp. 171–218, doi:10.1007/13836_2019_68, ISBN 978-3-030-37935-3, S2CID 213340840
- Selkoe, KA; D’Aloia, CC; Crandall, ED; Iacchei, M; Liggins, L; Puritz, JB; von der Heyden, S; Toonen, RJ (2016). "A decade of seascape genetics: contributions to basic and applied marine connectivity". Marine Ecology Progress Series. 554: 1–19. Bibcode:2016MEPS..554....1S. doi:10.3354/meps11792. hdl:10179/17416.
- Liggins, Libby; Treml, Eric; Possingham, Hugh; Riginos, Cynthia (2016). "Seascape features, rather than dispersal traits, predict spatial genetic patterns in co-distributed reef fishes". Journal of Biogeography. 43 (2): 256–267. Bibcode:2016JBiog..43..256L. doi:10.1111/jbi.12647. hdl:10179/17396. S2CID 84014254.
- Liggins, Libby; Booth, David J.; Figueira, Will F.; Treml, Eric A.; Tonk, Linda; Ridgway, Tyrone; Harris, David A.; Riginos, Cynthia (2015). "Latitude-wide genetic patterns reveal historical effects and contrasting patterns of turnover and nestedness at the range peripheries of a tropical marine fish". Ecography. 38 (12): 1212–1224. Bibcode:2015Ecogr..38.1212L. doi:10.1111/ecog.01398. hdl:10179/17394.
- Pope, LC; Liggins, Libby; Carvalho, SB; Keyse, Jude; Riginos, Cynthia (2015). "Not the time or the place: The missing spatio-temporal link in publicly available genetic data". Molecular Ecology. 24 (15): 3802–3809. Bibcode:2015MolEc..24.3802P. doi:10.1111/mec.13254. hdl:10179/17395. PMID 26033415.
- Liggins, Libby; Gleeson, Lachlan; Riginos, Cynthia (2014). "Evaluating edge-of-range genetic patterns for tropical echinoderms, Acanthaster planci and Tripneustes gratilla, of the Kermadec Islands, southwest Pacific". Bulletin of Marine Science. 90 (1): 379–397. Bibcode:2014BuMS...90..379L. doi:10.5343/bms.2013.1015. hdl:10179/17384.
- Liggins, Libby; Treml, Eric A.; Riginos, Cynthia (2013). "Taking the Plunge: An Introduction to Undertaking Seascape Genetic Studies and using Biophysical Models: Seascape genetic methods including biophysical models". Geography Compass. 7 (3): 173–196. doi:10.1111/gec3.12031. hdl:10179/17387.
