= Cate Macinnis-Ng =

New Zealand ecophysiologist

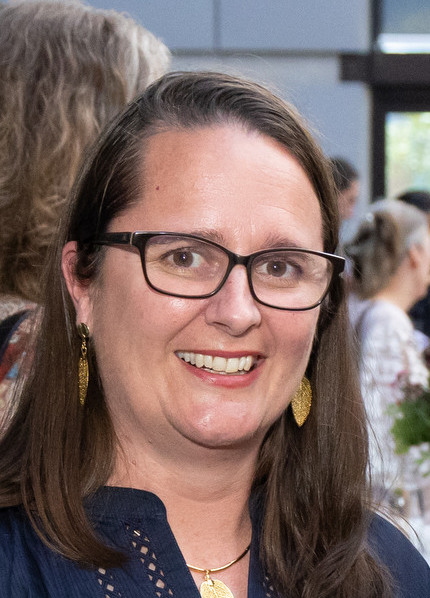
- Awards: Roger Slack Award, Rutherford Discovery Fellowship, Miriam Dell Award for Excellence in Science Mentoring

Academic background
- Education: University of Technology Sydney, University of Technology Sydney
- Thesis: In situ monitoring of toxic pollutant impacts on the photosynthesis of the seagrass Zostera capricorni Aschers (2002)

Catriona M. O. Macinnis-Ng is a New Zealand ecologist, and is a full professor at the University of Auckland, specialising in the effects of climate change, especially drought, on plants. She has been awarded a Rutherford Discovery Fellowship, the Roger Slack Award, and the Miriam Dell Award for Excellence in Science Mentoring.

== Academic career ==
Macinnis-Ng completed her undergraduate training in Sydney, before undertaking a PhD titled In situ monitoring of toxic pollutant impacts on the photosynthesis of the seagrass Zostera capricorni Aschers at the University of Technology Sydney. Macinnis-Ng held several research fellowships in Australia, before returning to New Zealand with her family in 2010. She joined the faculty of the University of Auckland in 2015, rising to full professor in 2024.

Macinnis-Ng was president of the New Zealand Ecological Society from 2017 to 2019. During her presidency she instituted a mentoring scheme that had mentored more than fifty members by 2023. Macinnis-Ng also mentors within the University of Auckland's Women in Science Programme, and serves on the Royal Society Te Apārangi Council.

Macinnis-Ng is a principal investigator in the Te Pūnaha Matatini Centre of Research Excellence. She was awarded a Marsden Fast-Start Grant in 2012 to research the ecophysiology of kauri trees, with respect to possible effects of drought and climate change.

== Honours and awards ==
In 2014, Macinnis-Ng was awarded a University of Auckland Early Career Research Excellence Award. She was awarded a Rutherford Discovery Fellowship in 2015 to research the impact of drought on native forest ecosystems. She was awarded the Roger Slack Award in 2016 by the New Zealand Society of Plant Biologists. In 2023 she received the Miriam Dell Award for Excellence in Science Mentoring from the New Zealand Association for Women in Science.

== Selected works ==
- Yan-Shih Lin; Medlyn, Belinda Elizabeth; Duursma, Remco; et al. (2015). "Optimal stomatal behaviour around the world". Nature Climate Change. 5 (5): 459–464. doi:10.1038/nclimate2550. Wikidata Q57191654.
- Ralph, Peter; David Tomasko; Kenneth Moore; Stephanie Seddon; Catrionà M. O. Macinnis-Ng, Human Impacts on Seagrasses: Eutrophication, Sedimentation, and Contamination, pp. 567–593, doi:10.1007/978-1-4020-2983-7_24, Wikidata Q56969835
- Nathalie Pettorelli; Henrike Schulte to Bühne; Tulloch, Ayesha; et al. (2017). "Satellite remote sensing of ecosystem functions: opportunities, challenges and way forward". Remote Sensing in Ecology and Conservation. 4 (2): 71–93. doi:10.1002/rse2.59. Wikidata Q58312835.
- O'Brien, Michael J.; Bettina M. J. Engelbrecht; Julia Joswig; et al. (2017). "A synthesis of tree functional traits related to drought-induced mortality in forests across climatic zones". Journal of Applied Ecology. 54 (6): 1669–1686. doi:10.1111/1365-2664.12874. Wikidata Q112803811.
- MacInnis, Catriona; Ralph, Peter (2002). "Towards a more ecologically relevant assessment of the impact of heavy metals on the photosynthesis of the seagrass, Zostera capricorni". Marine Pollution Bulletin. 45 (1–12): 100–106. doi:10.1016/s0025-326x(01)00300-9. PMID 12398373. Wikidata Q58275221.
- Zeppel, Melanie; Tissue, David; Daniel Taylor; MacInnis, Catriona; Derek Eamus (2010). "Rates of nocturnal transpiration in two evergreen temperate woodland species with differing water-use strategies". Tree Physiology. 30 (8): 988–1000. doi:10.1093/treephys/tpq053. PMID 20566582. Wikidata Q33611738.
- MacInnis, Catriona; Ralph, Peter (2003). "Short-term response and recovery of Zostera capricorni photosynthesis after herbicide exposure". Aquatic Botany. 76 (1): 1–15. doi:10.1016/s0304-3770(03)00014-7. Wikidata Q56969933.
