= James Russell (ecologist) =

New Zealand conservation biologist

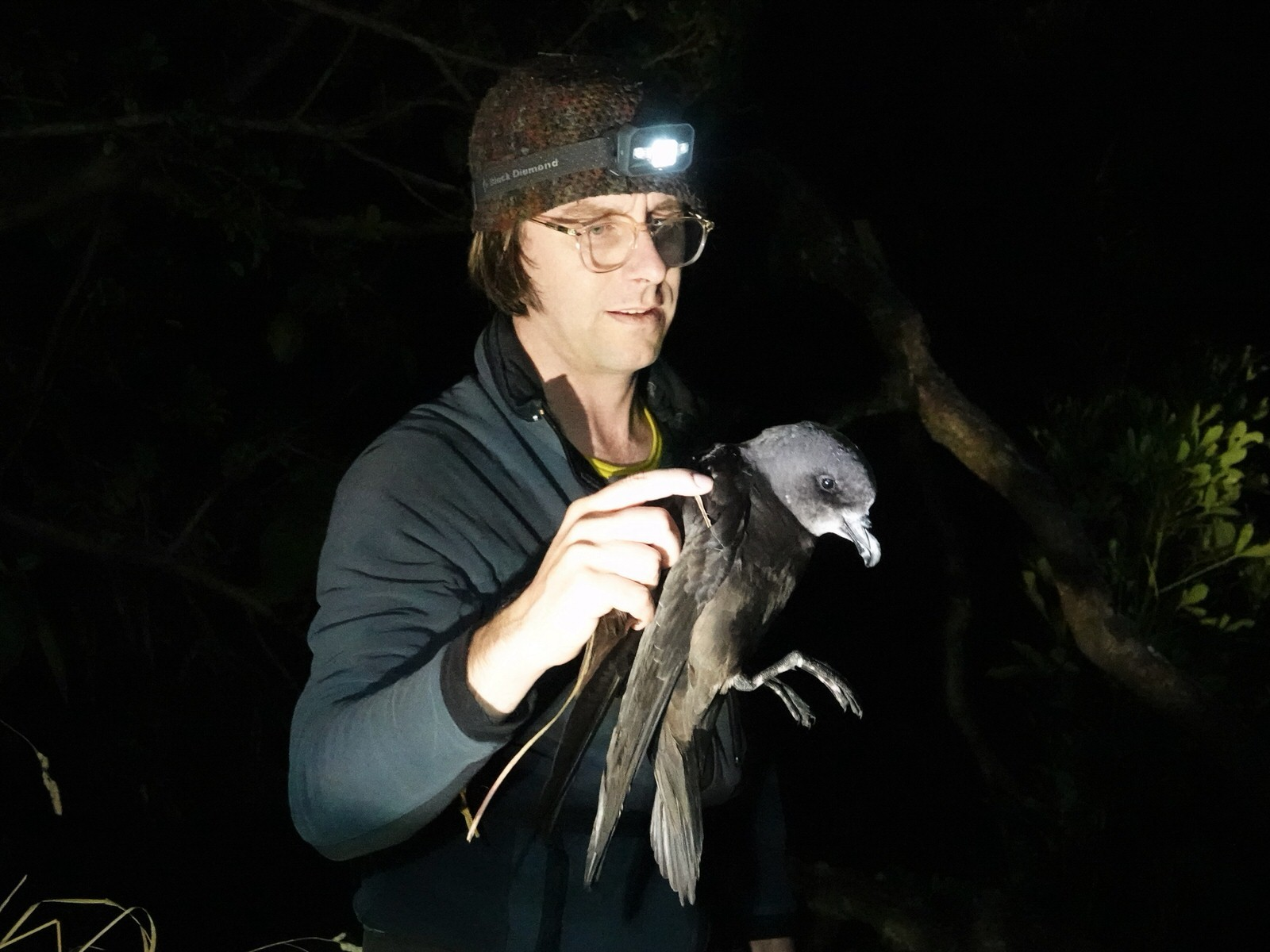
- Russell tagging a grey-faced petrel in 2016
- Born: James Charles Russell

James Charles Russell is a New Zealand conservation biologist and professor at the University of Auckland.

== Career ==
Russell gained a PhD on the genetics and invasion ecology of rats from the University of Auckland.

Russell is most widely known for his research on Norway rats (Rattus norvegicus) in New Zealand. One of the rats he studied swam over 400 metres between two Hauraki Gulf islands, breaking the swimming distance record for rats. The intentions of the rat are believed to have been amorous. The rat, known as Razza, was featured in Nature in 2005, and later in a children's book by Witi Ihimaera in 2006.

He writes a blog for National Geographic on island conservation as of 2018.

=== Eradication research ===
In 2015, he and a team wrote a paper estimating how much government funding would be required to develop new eradication technologies to eliminate predators in New Zealand, resulting in government funding for a research project.

In 2023, the BBC described him as a champion of New Zealand's initiative to eradicate predators in New Zealand to save native birds by 2050, called Predator Free 2050 Ltd, a public body. BBC reported that he "did much" to give scientific backing to the project. Also aiming to eradicate all invasive mammals, the plan was unveiled by Prime Minister John Key in 2016.

In 2022, he co-authored a paper that concluded that New Zealand was the top country in the world for eradicating invasive species, responsible for around a quarter of the world's island pest eradications, followed by Australia.

== Awards and honours ==
In 2012, Russell was awarded the New Zealand Prime Minister's MacDiarmid Emerging Scientist Prize, worth NZ$200,000, for his work using DNA fingerprinting of rats and statistical modelling to address conservation problems.

In 2014, Russell was awarded a Rutherford Discovery Fellowship, worth NZ$800,000, for research on conservation complexity: scaling vertebrate pest control.
