= Nicole Moreham =

Legal scholar and privacy researcher in New Zealand

Nicole Moreham FRSNZ
- Born: Nicole Anna Moreham
- Awards: Rutherford Discovery Fellowship

Academic background
- Education: University of Canterbury; University of Cambridge
- Thesis: Privacy and the common law (2004)
- Doctoral advisor: Tony Weir

Academic work
- Institutions: Victoria University of Wellington

Nicole Anna Moreham FRSNZ is a professor of law at Victoria University of Wellington in New Zealand. Her research focuses on media law and tort law, and she has a particular interest in privacy. She clerked at the New Zealand Court of Appeal and has taught at the University of Cambridge and Victoria University of Wellington. She was the first legal scholar in New Zealand to be awarded a Rutherford Discovery Fellowship. In 2025 Moreham was elected a Fellow of the Royal Society Te Apārangi.

== Academic career ==
Moreham completed a Bachelor of Laws at the University of Canterbury, and clerked for the New Zealand Court of Appeal.

Moreham has a Master of Laws and a PhD from the University of Cambridge. Her thesis was on privacy and common law, and was supervised by Tony Weir. She lectured in contract and administrative law at Cambridge, and was a Fellow of Gonville and Caius College. Moreham joined the faculty of Victoria University of Wellington in 2006, rising to full professor.

Moreham was awarded a Rutherford Discovery Fellowship in 2011, the first fellowship to be awarded to a legal scholar. Her proposal was to write a book with a "coherent theory of privacy law". Moreham co-authored the third edition of The Law of Privacy and The Media with Mark Warby.

In 2025 Moreham was elected a Fellow of the Royal Society Te Apārangi "for being a leading commentator on the law of privacy".

== Selected works ==
- Moreham, Nicole; Warby, Mark; Moreham, Nicole; Warby, Mark, eds. (21 January 2016). Tugendhat and Christie: The Law of Privacy and The Media (Third ed.). Oxford, New York: Oxford University Press. ISBN 978-0-19-968574-5.
- Moreham, Nicole (2023). "Privacy, free speech and legitimate audience interest". The Law Quarterly Review.
- Moreham, Nicole (10 November 2022). "Privacy, defamation and ZXC v Bloomberg". The Journal of Media Law. doi:10.25455/wgtn.22151861.
- Moreham, Nicole (16 November 2021). "Undue haste on housing bill". Newsroom.
- Moreham, N. A. (March 2021). "Privacy and police investigations: ZXC v Bloomberg". The Cambridge Law Journal. 80 (1): 5–8. doi:10.1017/S0008197321000143. ISSN 0008-1973. S2CID 232411740.
- Varuhas, Jason; Moreham, Nicole (18 October 2018). Remedies for breach of privacy. Hart Publishing. ISBN 978-1-5099-1562-0. OCLC 1035218192.
- Moreham, N. A. (20 December 2017). "Compensating for Loss of Dignity and Autonomy in the Misuse of Private Information Tort". Remedies for Breach of Privacy. Rochester, NY: 125–134. SSRN 3091461.
