= Kathryn Stowell =

New Zealand biomedical researcher

Kathryn Mary Stowell
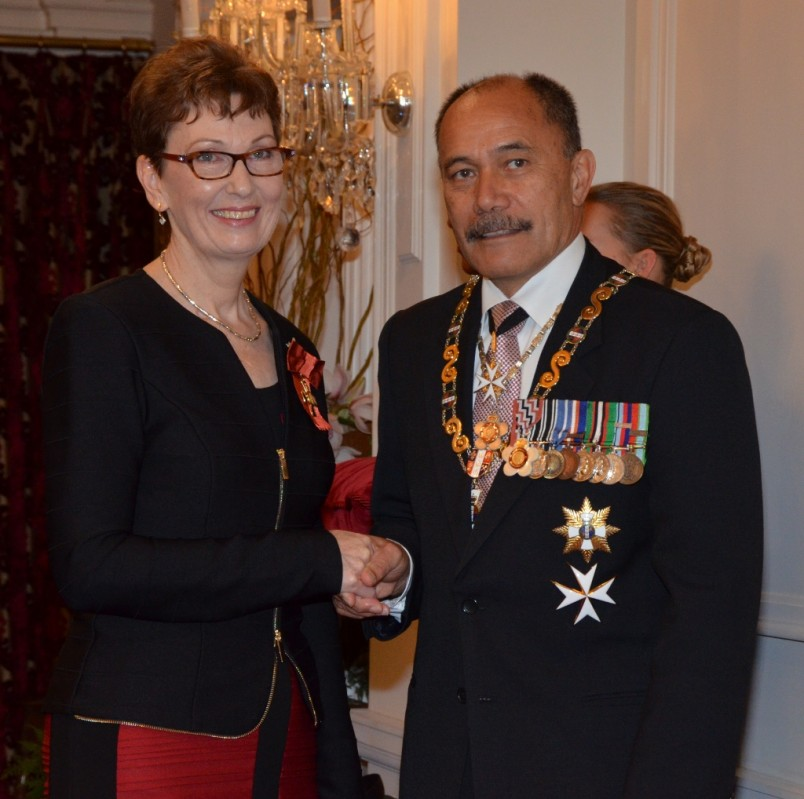
- Stowell (left) with Governor-General Jerry Mateparae at Stowell's investiture into the New Zealand Order of Merit, 21 May 2015.
- Education: Massey University
- Scientific career
- Fields: Biochemistry
- Workplaces: Massey University
- Thesis: Cloning and expression of the cDNA for human lactoferrin (1990)
- Doctoral students: Keren Dittmer

Kathryn Mary Stowell ONZM is a New Zealand academic. In November 2022 she was appointed professor emerita, having been a full professor from 2016 at the Massey University.

== Academic career ==
Stowell joined Massey University in 1976, after a 1990 PhD titled 'Cloning and expression of the cDNA for human lactoferrin,' she rose to full professor in 2015.

Stowell is best-known publicly for her work on malignant hyperthermia (MH), a genetic disorder which causes a severe and potentially fatal hypermetabolic reaction in susceptible people when exposed to inhaled anaesthetics or the muscle relaxant suxamethonium. Malignant hyperthermia has an incidence of between 1:10,000 and 1:250,000 worldwide, but 1:200 at Palmerston North Hospital due to a large family in the area carrying the gene for many generations. Stowell's work has largely concentrated on identifying the genetic basis for MH susceptibility, and developing genetic testing to replace the invasive muscle biopsy test currently used.

In 2015, Stowell was made an Officer of the New Zealand Order of Merit (ONZM) for her services to biomedical science.

Notable doctoral students of Stowell's include Keren Dittmer, professor of veterinary pathology at Massey University.

== Selected works ==
- Crossley, Merlin, Michael Ludwig, Kathryn M. Stowell, Piet De Vos, Klaus Olek, and George G. Brownlee. "Recovery from hemophilia B Leyden: an androgen-responsive element in the factor IX promoter." Science 257, no. 5068 (1992): 377–379.
- Rosenberg, Henry, Neil Pollock, Anja Schiemann, Terasa Bulger, and Kathryn Stowell. "Malignant hyperthermia: a review." Orphanet Journal of Rare Diseases 10, no. 1 (2015): 93.
- Davis, M., R. Brown, A. Dickson, H. Horton, D. James, N. Laing, R. Marston et al. "Malignant hyperthermia associated with exercise-induced rhabdomyolysis or congenital abnormalities and a novel RYR1 mutation in New Zealand and Australian pedigrees." British Journal of Anaesthesia 88, no. 4 (2002): 508–515.
- Stowell, K. M., T. A. Rado, W. D. Funk, and J. W. Tweedie. "Expression of cloned human lactoferrin in baby-hamster kidney cells." Biochemical Journal 276, no. Pt 2 (1991): 349.
- Brown RL; Pollock AN; Couchman KG; Hodges M; Hutchinson DO; Waaka R; Lynch P; McCarthy TV; Stowell KM (2000). "A novel ryanodine receptor mutation and genotype-phenotype correlation in a large malignant hyperthermia New Zealand Maori pedigree". Human Molecular Genetics. 9 (10): 1515–24. doi:10.1093/hmg/9.10.1515. PMID 10888602.
