= Scott Baker (marine biologist) =

American molecular biologist and cetacean specialist

C. Scott Baker
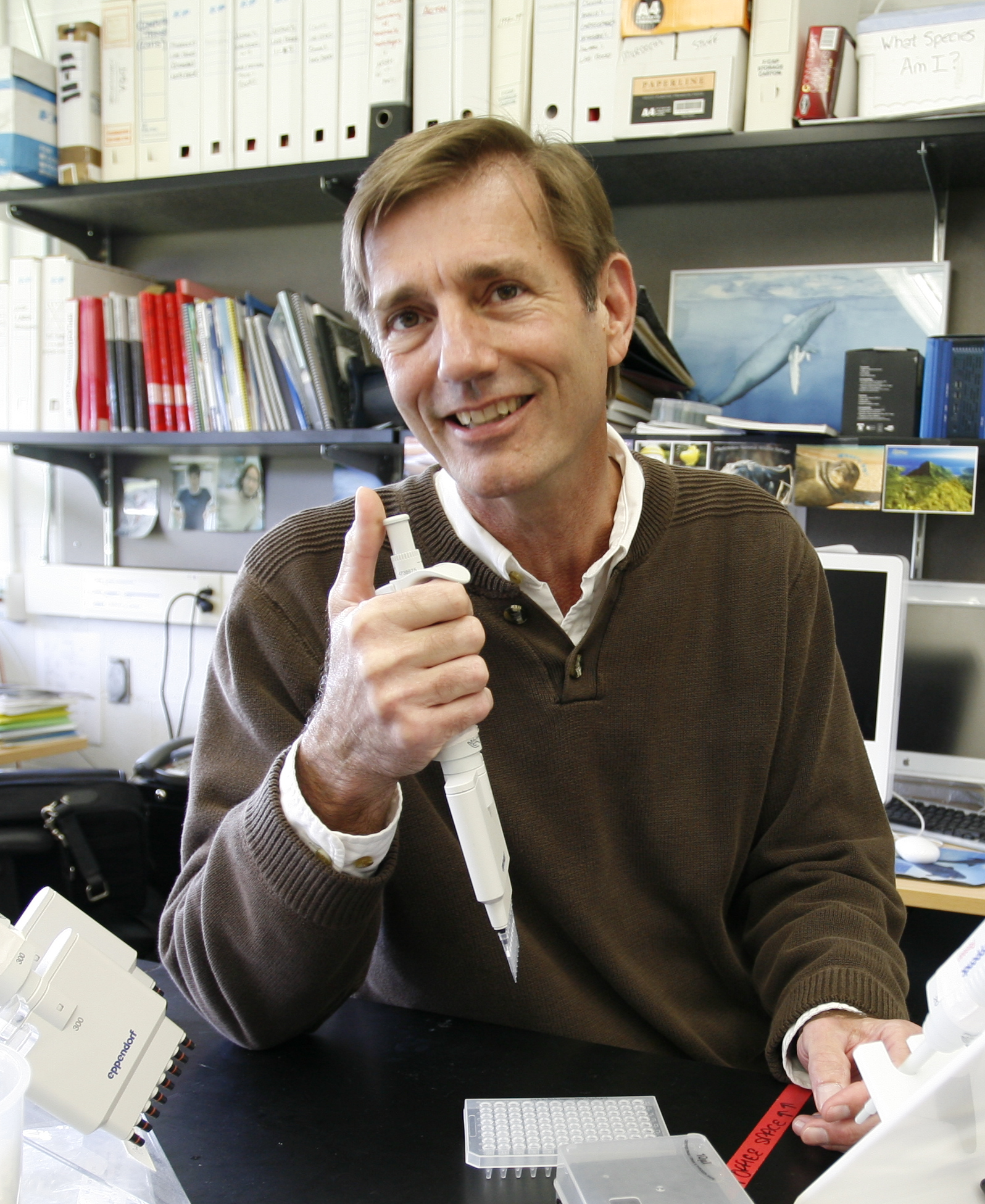
- Baker in his lab, 2010
- Born: August 10, 1954 (age 72); Birmingham, Alabama
- Occupations: conservation geneticist, molecular ecologist

Academic background
- Education: BA 1977; PhD 1985; New College of Florida; University of Hawaii at Manoa

Academic work
- Doctoral students: Rochelle Constantine
- Notable students: Alana Alexander

C. Scott Baker (born August 10, 1954) is an American molecular biologist and cetacean specialist. He is Associate Director of the Marine Mammal Institute at Oregon State University. He is also Adjunct Professor of Molecular Ecology and Evolution at the University of Auckland, and editor of the Journal of Heredity.

== Early life and work ==
Baker was an undergraduate at New College of Florida, later doing his PhD research on humpback whales at the University of Hawaii, Manoa. He later worked on molecular genetics at the Laboratory of Genomic Diversity, National Cancer Institute (1987–88). Starting in 1994, he became a regular delegate to the Scientific Committee of the International Whaling Commission for New Zealand or the USA, and a member of the Cetacean Specialist Group of the IUCN.

In 1993-94, Baker conducted molecular genetic surveys of whale products sold in Japan and South Korea for Earthtrust. The methods for molecular identification of whales, dolphins and porpoises used in these surveys have been implemented in the web-based program DNA-Surveillance.

== Recent work ==
In 2001, Baker was awarded the Bronze Medal in Science and Technology from the Royal Society of New Zealand for his work in applied conservation genetics. In 2007, he became Editor-in-Chief of the Journal of Heredity, the journal of the American Genetic Association.

Baker advised and took part in the feature documentary The Cove, and the National Geographic Channel documentary Kingdom of the Blue Whale.

He is currently working at Oregon State University, based in the Department of Fisheries and Wildlife and the Marine Mammal Institute at the Hatfield Marine Science Center.
