= Ruggiero Lovreglio =

Italian scientist

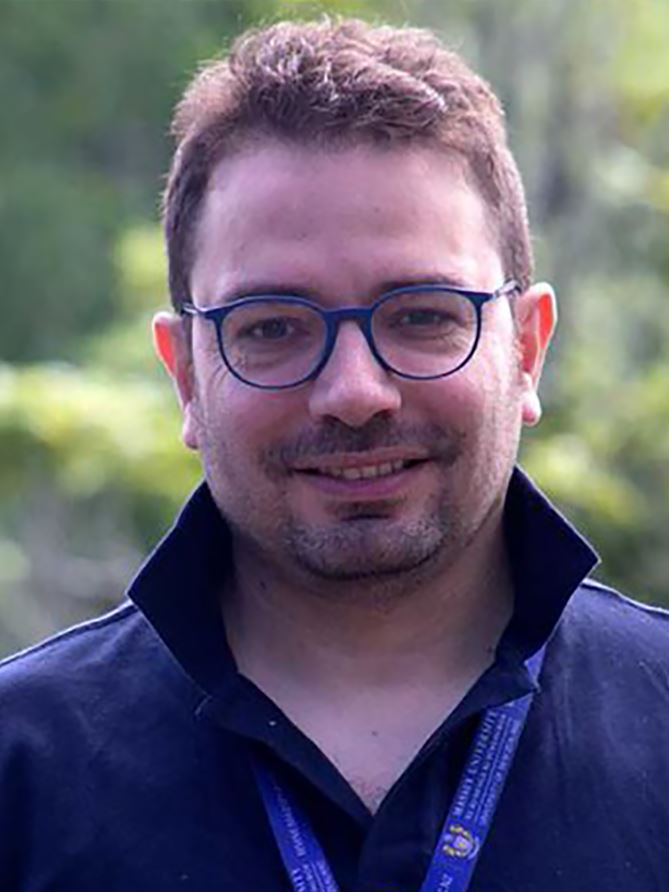
- Born: 1988 (age 37–38); Italy
- Education: Polytechnic University of Bari; Polytechnic University of Milan; Polytechnic University of Turin
- Awards: 5 under 35 SFPE; Massey Research Medal (Early Career)
- Scientific career
- Fields: Evacuation, Safety Training
- Workplaces: Massey University
- Thesis: Modelling Decision-Making in Fire Evacuation based on Random Utility Theory (2016)

Ruggiero Lovreglio (known also as Professor Rino) is a scientist based in Auckland, New Zealand. He is a professor at Massey University (New Zealand) and a Rutherford Discovery Fellow for Royal Society Te Apārangi (New Zealand). His research is focused on large-scale and small-scale evacuation dynamics and safety training using emerging technologies, such as virtual reality and augmented reality.

== Early life and education ==
Lovreglio lived in Barletta (Apuglia, Italy) most of his life before moving overseas. He is from a farming family which did not stop him from pursuing his interest in science and technology. He studied high school at Liceo Scientifico Carlo Cafiero, achieving a final grade of 100/100. He studied civil engineering for his bachelor's degree at Polytechnic University of Bari, graduating in 2010 cum laude. He pursued his master's studies in the same university, graduating in 2012 cum laude.

Lovreglio obtained his PhD in Civil Engineering from Scuola Interpolitecnica di Dottorato, Polytechnic University of Bari, Polytechnic University of Milan, Polytechnic University of Turin in 2016. He investigated how people make evacuation decisions while evacuating building fires. He was a Research Fellow from 2016 to 2018 at the University of Auckland and then at the National Institute of Standards and Technology (USA) to study human behavior in earthquakes and wildfires.

== Career ==
In 2018, he joined Massey University, where he established the Digital Built Environment Lab, focusing on the use of digital technologies for enhanced safety of built environments. Lovreglio is a professor at Massey University (New Zealand) and a Rutherford Discovery Fellow for the Royal Society Te Apārangi (New Zealand). He is an associate editor for Safety Science (Elsevier) and Fire Technology (Springer). He is a member of the editorial board of Fire Safety Journal (Elsevier) and Virtual Reality (Springer). Lovreglio has published over 100 peer-reviewed scientific works and he has led several research projects related to evacuation and safety training including a Marsden project funded by the Royal Society Te Apārangi. He represents New Zealand in the ISO Fire Safety Engineering working group: ISO/TC92/SC4/WG11. During his career, he has been a guest researcher and lecturer at Tsinghua University, NIST, Lund University, ETH Zurich, University of Canterbury, Polytechnic University of the Marches (Ancona), Edinburgh Napier University.

== Selected awards ==
- 2023 - Top 2% world's ranking of scientists in 2023, Stanford/Elsevier
- 2022 - 5 under 35 SFPE Award
- 2020 - Massey Research Medal (Early Career) - Massey University
- 2018 - Jack Watts Award - Fire Technology - Springer

== Selected works ==
- Haghani, Milad; Lovreglio, Ruggiero (9 December 2022). "Data-based tools can prevent crowd crushes". Science. 378 (6624): 1060–1061. Bibcode:2022Sci...378.1060H. doi:10.1126/science.adf5949. PMID 36480619.
- Lovreglio, Ruggiero; Dillies, Elise; Kuligowski, Erica; Rahouti, Anass; Haghani, Milad (September 2022). "Exit choice in built environment evacuation combining immersive virtual reality and discrete choice modelling". Automation in Construction. 141 104452. doi:10.1016/j.autcon.2022.104452.
- Lovreglio, Ruggiero; Gonzalez, Vicente; Feng, Zhenan; Amor, Robert; Spearpoint, Michael; Thomas, Jared; Trotter, Margaret; Sacks, Rafael (October 2018). "Prototyping virtual reality serious games for building earthquake preparedness: The Auckland City Hospital case study". Advanced Engineering Informatics. 38: 670–682. arXiv:1802.09119. doi:10.1016/j.aei.2018.08.018.
