= Kelly Dombroski =

New Zealand human geographer

- Citizenship: New Zealand
- Education: Massey University (BA, MPhil), Western Sydney University (PhD)
- Known for: Diverse and community economies research, Rutherford Discovery Fellow
- Awards: Rutherford Discovery Fellowship (2021)
- Scientific career
- Fields: Human geography, feminist geography, community economies
- Workplaces: Massey University, University of Canterbury
- Thesis: Babies' Bottoms for a Better World: Hygiene, Modernities, and Social Change in Northwest China and Australasia (2013)

Kelly Dombroski is a New Zealand human geographer who investigates community and diverse economies, care practices and post-development pathways in the Asia–Pacific region. She is professor of geography in the School of People, Environment and Planning at Massey University, and president of the New Zealand Geographical Society.

== Early life and education ==
Dombroski completed a Bachelor of Arts in environmental studies (2002) and a Master of Philosophy in development studies (2005) at Massey University. She earned her PhD in geography from Western Sydney University in 2013. Her dissertation, Babies' Bottoms for a Better World: Hygiene, Modernities, and Social Change in Northwest China and Australasia, examined infant-care practices as sites of economic and cultural transformation.

== Career ==
From 2017 to 2022 Dombroski taught human geography at the University of Canterbury, where she established research programmes on community economies and urban wellbeing. In 2021 she was one of eleven scholars nationwide to receive a five-year Rutherford Discovery Fellowship for the project "Transitioning to Caring Economies through Transformative Community Investments".

She joined Massey University as professor in 2023. Beyond academia she is a founding member of the Community Economies Institute, and serves on the editorial boards of Asia Pacific Viewpoint and New Zealand Geographer.

Dombroski's work foregrounds the everyday practices through which people create livelihoods outside conventional capitalist frames. Using feminist, ethnographic and action-research methods, she has documented community enterprises in Aotearoa New Zealand, China, Indonesia and the Pacific. Her scholarship has advanced concepts of “caring economies”, “commoning” and “postcapitalist transition”, and informs policy debates on waste reduction, wellbeing budgets and urban regeneration.

== Honours and awards ==
Dombroski received a 2024 Marsden award to lead the project "Reduce, reuse, repair: what motivates us to create less waste?". In 2021, Dombroski secured one of Aotearoa New Zealand's nationally competitive five-year Rutherford Discovery Fellowships, awarded by Royal Society Te Apārangi for her programme "Transitioning to Caring Economies through Transformative Community Investments".

The University of Canterbury recognised her teaching with a Teaching Excellence Award in 2020, praising the way she integrates bicultural competence and research-led pedagogy in large undergraduate courses. Earlier, the College of Science named her its Emerging Researcher of the Year (2017), and the New Zealand Geographical Society presented her with the President's Award for Emerging Researcher in Geography the same year.

== Selected works (most cited) ==
Dombroski’s scholarship on diverse and caring economies is widely cited. Notable contributions include her co-authored opening to The Handbook of Diverse Economies, which has become a touchstone for post-capitalist research, and field-defining articles on community economies, care and disaster recovery.

- Gibson-Graham, J.K.; Dombroski, Kelly (2020). "Introduction: Inventory as Ethical Intervention". The Handbook of Diverse Economies. Edward Elgar. pp. 1–24.
- Gibson-Graham, J.K.; Cameron, Jenny; Dombroski, Kelly (2020). "Cultivating Community Economies: Tools for Building a Livable World". In Speth, James Gustave; Courrier, Kathleen (eds.). The New Systems Reader: Alternatives to a Failed Economy. Routledge. pp. 410–432. doi:10.4324/9780367313401. ISBN 978-0-367-31340-1.
- Dombroski, Kelly; Healy, Stephen; McKinnon, Katharine (2018). "Care-full Community Economies". Feminist Political Ecology and the Economics of Care. Routledge. pp. 99–115. doi:10.4324/9781315648743-6. hdl:10179/17756. ISBN 978-1-315-64874-3.
