= Polar ecology =

Relationship between plants and animals and a polar environment

Polar ecology is the relationship between plants and animals in a polar environment. Polar environments are in the Arctic and Antarctic regions. Arctic regions are in the Northern Hemisphere, and it contains land and the islands that surrounds it. Antarctica is in the Southern Hemisphere and it also contains the land mass, surrounding islands and the ocean. Polar regions also contain the subantarctic and subarctic zone which separate the polar regions from the temperate regions. Antarctica and the Arctic lie in the polar circles. The polar circles are imaginary lines shown on maps to be the areas that receives less sunlight due to less radiation. These areas either receive sunlight (midnight sun) or shade (polar night) 24 hours a day because of the earth's tilt. Plants and animals in the polar regions are able to withstand living in harsh weather conditions but are facing environmental threats that limit their survival.

== Climate ==
Polar climates are cold, windy and dry. Because of the lack of precipitation and low temperatures the Arctic and Antarctic are considered the world's largest deserts or Polar deserts. Much of the radiation from the Sun that is received is reflected off the snow making the polar regions cold. When the radiation is reflected, the heat is also reflected. The polar regions reflect 89-90% of the Sun radiation that the Earth receives. And because Antarctica is closer to the Sun at perihelion, it receives 7% more radiation than the Arctic. Also in the polar region, the atmosphere is thin. Because of this the UV radiation that gets to the atmosphere can cause fast sun tanning and snow blindness.

Polar regions are dry areas; there is very little precipitation due to the cold air. There are some times when the humidity may be high but the water vapor present in the air may be low. Wind is also strong in the polar region. Wind carries snow creating blizzard like conditions. Winds may also move small organisms or vegetation if it is present. The wind blows the snow making snowdrifts or snow dunes which may exist even in the spring when the snow is thawing out. It is hard for meteorologists to measure the amount of precipitation. This is because it is expensive to take care of the stations that collect weather data and it hard for them to measure snowfall amounts because the wind blows the snow too much to calculate exact amounts.

The temperatures are similar between the Arctic and Antarctic. The temperatures in the Arctic are different depending on the location. Temperatures in the Arctic have a higher range than in the Antarctic. Temperatures can range as much as 100 °C (180 °F). Along the coast in the Arctic temperatures average −30 to −40 °C (−22 to −40 °F) in December, January and February. The ice melts along the coast during the summer months which are around June, July and August and the temperature may rise a few degrees above freezing causing there to be some vegetation. During these same months in the northern regions, there will be 24 hours of daylight. Arctic regions also receive a lot of snowfall. The Arctic Basin has snow 320 days out of the year while the Arctic Seas have snow cover 260 days a year. The thickness of the snow averages 30–40 cm (12–16 in). In Greenland, temperatures have an average temperature of −40 °C (−40 °F) in the winter and in the summer the temperatures reach −12 °C (10 °F). Iceland, on the other hand, is in a subarctic region meaning it is near the temperate zone. Because of this, the temperatures are above the freezing point throughout much of the year. In Russia, temperatures are extremely cold. In Verkhoyansk, Siberia it has reached the coldest temp of −68.8 °C (−91.8 °F) in the Northern Hemisphere. The temperatures in the summer in Siberia can get to 36 °C (97 °F).

In the Antarctic, there are fewer temperature variations. Temperatures only range by around 30 °C (54 °F). The winter months are May till September while the summer months will be October till April. The sun reappears in September which then starts the 24 hours of daylight. The temperatures are different between the plateaus in Antarctica and between the coasts. The plateaus are the coldest regions of Antarctica. In the summer months there is low precipitation with light winds. Vostok has received the lowest temperature worldwide getting as low as −88.3 °C (−126.9 °F) in 1960. The West Antarctica plateau reaches snow levels of around 30 cm (12 in). This area is also warmer but it receives the heaviest snow and receives more wind. Because of the cold desert-like conditions on the plateaus, there are very little plants and animals. Some species of birds though have been seen.

On the coasts, in the summer there is more wind, and it is cloudier. Coasts with higher latitudes have a temperature of −24 °C (−11 °F) in the winter months whereas lower latitude coasts get down to −20 °C (−4 °F). Coastal areas may receive 40 cm (16 in) or more of snow.

== Water ==
Water is an important part of human survival. Because of its cold temperature, much of the Earth's water comes from the polar regions. 90% of the world's water comes from the Antarctic ice cap although a lot of this water is not used. Water environments are important for many species around the world. Many bacteria thrive there as well as algae and flora.

Many of the ponds or lakes in polar regions are frozen over or snow-covered for most of the year. Larger lakes thaw out around the edges during the warmer months while the smaller lakes thaw entirely. There are few rivers in the polar regions. The Arctic has more rivers compared to Antarctica. The regions also have ponds. The ponds that attract birds tend to be rich in nutrients. This is because of the bird droppings or bird feathers. There are two different types of lakes in polar regions including Arctic lakes and Antarctic lakes. Of the Arctic lakes, they include glacial lakes and permafrost lakes.

The polar regions include the Arctic Ocean and the Southern Ocean. The Arctic Ocean covers 14,000,000 km^{2} (5,400,000 sq mi). In the spring the ice covers an area of 5,000,000–8,000,000 km^{2} (1,900,000–3,100,000 sq mi) and in the winter it is twice that. In this area, it is never totally ice-covered. This is due to the winds breaking up the ice. Because of these cracks in the ice there is more biological productivity in the ocean.

The Southern Ocean is 28,000,000 km^{2} (11,000,000 sq mi). This ocean contains the Weddell Sea and Ross Sea. The ocean contains large packs of ice that surrounds Antarctica.

== Land ==
Because of the cold weather it is hard for plants to grow. Frozen ground covers most of the polar regions for the majority of the year. Permafrost reaches a thickness of 600–1,000 m (2,000–3,300 ft) deep. Large amounts of permafrost can lead to poor water drainage. Due to the permafrost the water in the soil remains frozen for most of the year. In the summer the top of the permafrost may be covered with water due to melting in the area. Weathering is also common in polar regions. There is rubble from rocks that are scattered on the land due to movement of glaciers. Also quick temperature change causes weathering.

The main type of soil in the polar regions is ahumic soil. This includes the cold desert soil. This soil consists of sand that is frozen. These soils tend to not have an abundant amount of vegetation but bacteria has been found.

The other type of soil is organic soil. This type of soil is found in areas that are warmer and have more moisture. Some vegetation that lives here are algae, fungi and mosses. One type of organic soil is the brown soils, which have drainage.

== Animals ==
Due to the harsh weather in the polar regions, there are not many animals. The animals that do exist in the polar region are similar between the Antarctic and Arctic regions. The animals do differ by the temperature. In the Arctic some invertebrates include spiders, mites, mosquitoes and flies. In warmer areas of the polar regions moths, butterflies and beetles can be found. Some of the larger animals that exist are foxes, wolves, rabbits, hares, polar bears, reindeer / caribou. There are various bird species that have been spotted in the Arctic. Eight species of birds reside on the polar tundra year round while 150 breed in the Arctic. The birds that do breed go to the Arctic between May and July. One of the known birds is the snowy owl, which has enough fat on it to be able to survive in the cold temperatures.

In the Antarctic some invertebrates that exist are mites, fleas and ticks. Antarctica is the only continent that does not have a land mammal population. There are about 60 types of birds that can be found in Antarctica, although many are accidental. Two studies have assessed the contributions of soil invertebrates to the polar ecosystem in Antarctica, suggesting that biotic interactions play crucial roles in such a seemingly simple ecosystem.

For animals to be able to live in the polar region they have to have adaptations which allow them to live in the cold and windy environments. These animals have originated with these adaptations, and animals that live in these regions are accumulating adaptations to be able to live in this type of environment. Some of these adaptations may be to be big and insulated, have a lot of fur, and to be darker. Also, many animals live in groups to be able to protect themselves from the cold. Animals also tend to be homeotherms which are animals that maintain a high temperature. Smaller invertebrates also tend to be smaller in polar regions which helps them conserve energy.

There are also many different animals that live in the sea water near polar regions. Squids are one animal that live in both Antarctica and the Arctic. They are the food source for other large animals such as the male sperm whale. There is also a wide variety of fish in the polar regions. Arctic cod is a major species in the Arctic. Halibut, cod, herring, and Alaska pollock (walleye pollock) are some other types of fish. In Antarctica there is not a lot of diversity among the fish; there is a lot of the same kind. Antarctic silverfish and lanternfish are some examples of fish that live in Antarctica.

Seals are also found in polar regions and number around 2.5 million. They are known to breed on land in the polar regions. Whales are also in the polar regions and can be found near the surfaces of water where they pray.

There are also birds that breed in the polar regions. In the Arctic, 95% of the birds breeding here consists of only four different species. These include the northern fulmar, kittiwake, the little auk and the thick-billed murre. These birds breed here when the ice starts to thaw and when there are cracks in the ice so the birds are able to feed. In the Antarctic there are two different birds that live there including the penguin and the procellariiformes.

== Vegetation ==
There is a wide source of vegetation in the polar region but there are few species in common in the southern and northern polar regions. The Arctic consists of desert and tundra vegetations. The desert vegetation consists of algae, lichens, and mosses. Lichens are the most dominant plants. The ground is bare with a patchy cover of lichens and mosses. Flowering plants are also seen but not as common. It only contains 60 species of flowering plants. The Arctic tundra vegetation also consists of lichens and mosses, but it includes shrubs, grasses and forbs as well. The amount of vegetation in the tundra consists on how much sun, or snow cover is in the area. The vegetation in this area may grow as tall as 50 cm (20 in). In the southern part of the Arctic, there tend to be more shrubs whereas the northern parts there is less plant cover. In wet areas of the tundra, there is tussock grasses and cotton grasses. In moist areas, there are short grasses, mosses, willows, and birches.

The Antarctic vegetation consists of algae or lichens, and some bacteria and fungi, although mosses and lichens dominate. The algae and lichens grow where there is moisture, and they hide in cracks to be protected from the wind. The dominant grassland is the tussock. These grasses get to be 2 m (6 ft 7 in) high, so they provide habitat for many mammals. Of the 14,000,000 km^{2} (5,400,000 sq mi) of land that makes up Antarctic, less than 2% of it does not have snow or ice.

One example of a type of vegetation is a crustose lichen. These lichens are found in moist areas that are hidden from the wind. They hide on the surface of rocks in the cracks. They survive off the water that melts from above. These lichens occur in Canada and Alaska, as well as Greenland and Iceland. These lichens can be red or orange colored and are known to defoliate rocks.

== Threats ==
There exist many threats to the polar regions. One threat is whaling. Whaling started in the 16th century. People hunted whales to sell meat. By 1925 the number of whales being killed rose from 14,000 to 40,000. The International Whaling Commission tried to stop whaling in the 20th century, but was unsuccessful.

Overfishing is another threat to the polar regions. In the Bering Sea there is a lot of fishing due to the high populations of halibut and Alaskan Pollock. Around the 1970s krill began to become a popular crustacean to catch. The Soviet Union started advertising food with krill in it and they started overfishing krill. It has been estimated that 40 tonnes of krill per hour were caught during this time. In 1982, the exclusive economic zone was established. This said that a certain country can fish 200 nmi (370 km; 230 mi) off the shore. The country is now able to control who fishes in their EEZ area. But the EEZ has been unsuccessful.

Another threat is pollution. There are many land and water areas within the polar regions that are contaminated. This can be due to the transport of oil by large ships. Siberia is one example of a place that has had major pollution in its rivers.

Depletion on the ozone layer is one more threat. An ozone hole has been detected above Antarctica. The cause of the depletion of the ozone layer is due to chlorofluorocarbons and other greenhouse gases. The other main reason is due to man-made gases that are released into the atmosphere. There are many environmental effects due to this because of the gases that are being released five times faster than they are destroyed.

Global warming is also having an effect on the Arctic and Antarctic regions. Global warming is causing the temperature on the earth to increase. In Plan B 2.0 Lester R. Brown talks about how the Arctic is warming twice as fast as the rest of the world. He goes on to say that the temperature in the Arctic region has increased by 3–4 °C (5–7 °F) within the last half-century. And with the increase in temperatures, some worry that this will cause the sea level to rise. Scientists believe that if the Greenland ice sheet melts then the sea level could rise by 23 ft (7.0 m) The melting of this ice sheet or others could have an effect on ocean currents. It could cause lower temperatures in northern North America. Rising of the sea level will also impact coastal areas. One example is in Bangladesh. If there was a 1 m (3 ft 3 in) increase in sea level then millions of people would have to migrate from the coast. Global warming is also affecting Antarctica. The Larsen Ice Shelf or Larsen A is an ice sheet on the Antarctic Peninsula. The sheet broke in 1995, and then in 2000 an iceberg that is 4,250 sq mi (11,000 km^{2}) broke off the Ross Ice Shelf in Antarctica. In 2002 Larsen B, which was 5,500 km^{2} (2,100 sq mi), broke off.

Global warming affects plants and animals. For plants, the warmer temperatures induce stress on the plants. For animals, there has been a decrease in the number of polar bears in the Hudson Bay area. Since 1981, the polar bear population has been declining. This is because global warming causes the ice to break up faster so the polar bears are going to the coasts when there are poor conditions.

== Conservation efforts ==
Whoever owns the land is responsible or managing it. And the owners of the land differ between the Antarctic and Arctic and also within the polar regions. In the Arctic, there are six nations that own the land about 60°N. These nations include: Canada, Russia, Finland, USA, Denmark, Iceland and Norway. There have been international treaties set up so there are no disputes. These nations have also set their government to manage the land properly. They have set up national parks, land for wilderness, and also land for research. In the polar regions, there have been laws set up to manage the number of visitors. There have been rules set up allowing only a certain amount of mining to be done and other measures to protect the environment from damages.

In the Antarctic, the owners of the land are less clear. Some areas of Antarctica are controlled by the French, while other areas are controlled by South Africa, Australia, New Zealand, and the UK. Whoever owns the Antarctic is still unclear therefore many other countries have put out scientific stations. The Antarctic Treaty System of 1961 was established to make sure all the conflicts were resolved about who owned the land. This and other treaties have shown interest in helping to conserve the Antarctic region. All of these countries have conservation laws. These laws manage the amount of hunting in the area, monitor invasive species, and control burning and settlement.

== See also ==
- Arctic ecology

== Bibliography ==
- Arntz, W.E., Clarke., 2002. Ecological Studies in the Antarctic Sea Ice Zone. Springer, New York.
- Bergstrom, D.M., Convey, P., Huiskes, A. H.L., 2006. Trends in Antarctic Terrestrial and Limnetic Ecosystems. Springer, The Netherlands.
- Brown, L. R., 2006. Plan B 2.0: Rescuing a Planet Under Stress and a Civilization in Trouble. Earth Policy Institute, New York.
- Fog, G.E., 1998. The Biology of Polar Habitats. Oxford University Press, New York.
- Marchand, F.L., Kockelbergh, F., Vijver, B. V.D., Beyens, L., and Jijs, I., 2005. "Are heat and cold resistance of arctic species affected by successive extreme temperature events?" New Phytologist. V. 170, pg 291–300.
- Melnikov, I.A., 1997. The Arctic Sea Ice Ecosystem. P.P. Shirshov Institute of Oceanology, Russia.
- Moustakas, A. & I. Karakassis. How diverse is aquatic biodiversity research?, Aquatic Ecology, 39, 367-375
- Nuttall, M., Callaaghan, T.V., 2000. The Arctic: Environment, People, Policy. Harwood Academic, UK.
- Stirling, I., Lunn, N.J., Iacozza, J., 1999. Long-term Trends in the Population Ecology of Polar Bears in Western Hudson Bay in Relation to Climate Change. The Arctic Institute of North America. V. 52 No. 3, p. 294-306.
- Stonehouse, B., 1998. Polar Biology. Chapman and Hall, New York.
- Wein, R.W., MacLean, D. A., The Role of Fire in Northern Circumpolar Ecosystems. Scientific Committee on Problems of the Environment, New York.
