= Veterinary Pathology (journal) =

- Language: English
- Edited by: Jeff L. Caswell

Publication details
- History: 1964 -present
- Publisher: SAGE Publications
- Frequency: Bi-monthly
- Impact factor: 2.11 (2019)

Standard abbreviations
- ISO 4: Vet. Pathol.

Indexing
- ISSN: 0300-9858
- LCCN: 77646648
- OCLC no.: 51952823

Links
- Journal homepage; Online access; Online archive

Veterinary Pathology is a peer-reviewed academic journal that publishes papers in the field of veterinary pathology. As of 2017, the journal's editor is Jeff L. Caswell, Pathology Professor at the University of Guelph. It has been in publication since 1964 and is currently published by SAGE Publications, in association with the American College of Veterinary Pathologists, the European College of Veterinary Pathologists, and the Japanese College of Veterinary Pathologists.

== Scope ==
Veterinary Pathology publishes reports of basic and applied research involving wildlife, marine and zoo animals and poultry. The journal focuses on details of the diagnostic investigations of diseases of animals, reports of experimental studies on mechanisms of specific processes and also provides insights into animal models of human disease.

== Abstracting and indexing ==
Veterinary Pathology is abstracted and indexed in, among other databases: SCOPUS, and the Social Sciences Citation Index. According to the Journal Citation Reports, its 2019 impact factor is 2.11, ranking it 14 out of 141 journals in the category 'Veterinary Science' and 41 out of 75 journals in the category 'Pathology'.
