= Bobbie Hunter =

New Zealand education research academic

Bobbie Hunter MNZM
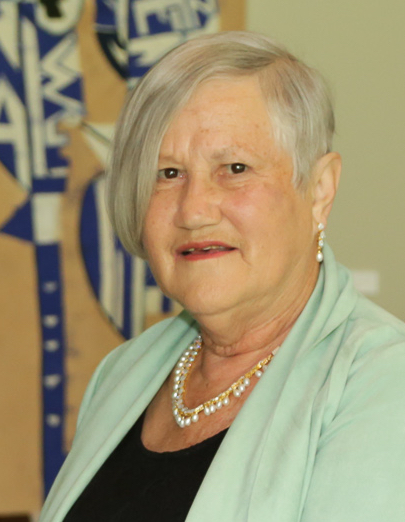
- Hunter in 2020
- Education: Massey University
- Scientific career
- Fields: Mathematics education, culturally responsive teaching
- Workplaces: Massey University
- Thesis: Teachers developing communities of mathematical inquiry (2007)

Roberta Kathleen Hunter MNZM is a New Zealand education academic of Cook Islands Māori descent and as of 2019 is a full professor at the Massey University. She specialises in mathematics education.

== Academic career ==
After a 2002 MSc titled 'Constructing decimal concepts in an inquiry classroom' and a 2007 PhD titled 'Teachers developing communities of mathematical inquiry ' at the Massey University, Hunter joined the staff, rising to full professor.

In the 2020 Queen's Birthday Honours, Hunter was appointed a Member of the New Zealand Order of Merit, for services to mathematics education.

== Selected works ==
- Hunter, Roberta, and Glenda Anthony. "Forging mathematical relationships in inquiry-based classrooms with Pasifika students." Journal of Urban Mathematics Education 4, no. 1 (2011): 98–119.
- Hunter, Roberta. "Facilitating communities of mathematical inquiry." Navigating currents and charting directions 1 (2008): 31–39.
- Hunter, Roberta. "Changing roles and identities in the construction of a community of mathematical inquiry." Journal of Mathematics Teacher Education 13, no. 5 (2010): 397–409.
