= Louise Chilvers =

New Zealand marine biologist

- Other name: Barbara Louise Chilvers
- Education: James Cook University
- Scientific career
- Fields: Marine biology
- Workplaces: Massey University
- Thesis: Behavioural ecology of bottlenose dolphins, Tursiops aduncus, in S.E. Queensland, Australia: Adaptations to ecological and anthropogenic influences (2002)

Barbara Louise Chilvers is a New Zealand marine biologist who researches marine mammals. She is Professor of Wildlife Ecology in the School of Veterinary Science at Massey University and Director of Wildbase Oiled Wildlife Response at the university.

== Academic career ==
Chilvers graduated with a Bachelor of Agricultural Science from Lincoln University in 1994. She moved to James Cook University in Townsville, Queensland to study for a PhD which she completed in 2002. Her thesis was titled "Behavioural ecology of bottlenose dolphins, Tursiops aduncus, in S.E. Queensland, Australia: Adaptations to ecological and anthropogenic influences".

Returning to New Zealand, Chilvers joined Massey University where she was appointed full professor with effect from 1 January 2019.

== Selected works ==
- Harcourt, Robert; Marsh, Helene; Slip, David; Chilvers, Louise; Noad, Mike; Dunlop, Rebecca (2015). Austral Ark: the state of wildlife in Australia and New Zealand. Cambridge University Press. pp. 322–353.
- B Louise Chilvers; Steven Delean; Nicholas J Gales; Dave K Holley; Ivan R Lawler; Helene Marsh; Anthony R Preen (June 2004). "Diving behaviour of dugongs, Dugong dugon". Journal of Experimental Marine Biology and Ecology. 304 (2): 203–224. doi:10.1016/J.JEMBE.2003.12.010. ISSN 0022-0981.
- B Louise Chilvers; Phil F Battley (27 August 2019). "Species prioritization index for oiled wildlife response planning in New Zealand". Marine Pollution Bulletin. 149 110529. doi:10.1016/J.MARPOLBUL.2019.110529. ISSN 0025-326X. PMID 31470208.
- Karin A Sievwright; Phil F Battley; Helen M McConnell; B Louise Chilvers; Kerri J Morgan (5 September 2019). "Post-release breeding success of oil-rehabilitated and non-rehabilitated little blue penguins, Eudyptula minor, following the M/V Rena oil spill, New Zealand". Marine Pollution Bulletin. 149 110553. doi:10.1016/J.MARPOLBUL.2019.110553. ISSN 0025-326X. PMID 31543491.
- Louise Chilvers; K J Morgan; B J White (21 August 2020). "Sources and reporting of oil spills and impacts on wildlife 1970-2018". Environmental Science and Pollution Research. 28 (1): 754–762. doi:10.1007/S11356-020-10538-0. ISSN 0944-1344. PMID 32822011.
