= Loren H. Rieseberg =

American botanist

- Born: 1961 (age 64–65); Alberta, Canada
- Education: Washington State University
- Awards: Darwin–Wallace Medal (2012)
- Scientific career
- Fields: Botany
- Workplaces: University of British Columbia; Indiana University
- Website: www.botany.ubc.ca/people/loren-rieseberg

Loren H. Rieseberg FRSC FRS FRSB (born 1961) is a Canadian-American botanist.

Born in Alberta, Canada, his family moved to the US. He graduated from Washington State University with a Ph.D. in 1987.

He is a Professor of Botany at the University of British Columbia and a Distinguished Professor of Biology at Indiana University, and head of the Rieseberg Lab. In October 2016, he was appointed the Director of the UBC Biodiversity Research Centre, replacing Sally Otto. He is on the editorial boards of numerous journals and has edited Molecular Ecology for many years.

== Honours and awards ==
- 1998 David Starr Jordan Prize
- 2003 MacArthur Fellows Program
- 2010 Elected Fellow of the Royal Society of London, Royal Society of Canada and Society of Biology
- 2012 Darwin–Wallace Medal

== Works ==
- Rieseberg, L.H., and J.H. Willis. "Plant speciation". 2007. Science 317:910-914.
- Rieseberg, L.H., T.E. Wood, and E. Baack. 2006. "The nature of plant species". Nature 440:524-527.
- Harter, A.V., K.A. Gardner, D. Falush, D.L. Lentz, R. Bye, L.H. Rieseberg. 2004. "Origin of extant domesticated sunflowers in eastern North America". Nature 430:201-205.
- Burke, J.M., and L.H. Rieseberg. 2003. "The fitness effects of transgenic disease resistance in wild sunflowers". Science 300:1250.
- Rieseberg, L.H., O. Raymond, D.M. Rosenthal, Z. Lai, K. Livingstone, T. Nakazato, J.L. Durphy, A.E. Schwarzbach, L.A. Donovan, and C. Lexer. 2003. "Major ecological transitions in annual sunflowers facilitated by hybridization". Science 301:1211-1216.
- Rieseberg, L. H., A. Widmer, M. A. Arntz, and J. M. Burke. 2002. "Directional selection is the primary cause of phenotypic diversification". Proceedings of the National Academy of Sciences 99:12242-12245.
