= Siautu Alefaio-Tugia =

Samoan–New Zealand professor of psychology

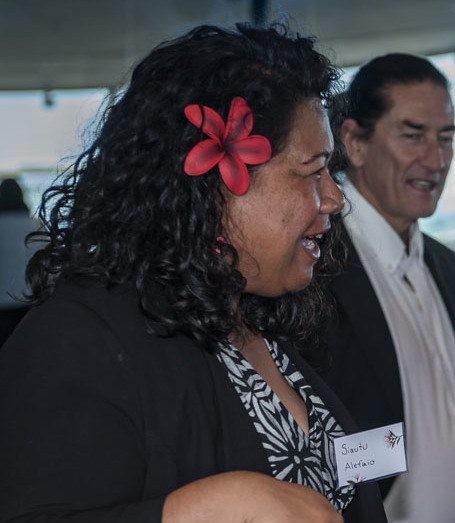
- Citizenship: New Zealand
- Education: Monash University (PhD 2015); Massey University (PGDipEdPsych 2001); University of Auckland (BA Psychology)
- Known for: Founder of NIUPatCH collective; book Pacific-Indigenous Psychology
- Awards: Rutherford Discovery Fellowship (2020); Fulbright New Zealand Scholar Award (2023)
- Scientific career
- Fields: Pacific-Indigenous psychology; humanitarian and disaster psychology
- Workplaces: Massey University (2001–2023); University of Otago (2024–present)
- Thesis: Galuola: A NIU way for informing psychology from the cultural context of Fa‘a Samoa (2015)

Siautu Alefaio-Tugia is a Samoan-New Zealand psychologist whose work integrates Pacific-Indigenous knowledge with humanitarian and disaster-resilience psychology. In 2024 she became the first Pacific Professor of Psychology at the University of Otago.

== Early life and education ==
Alefaio-Tugia was born in Dunedin and raised in Ōtara, South Auckland, within a Samoan church community.

She completed a BA in psychology at the University of Auckland, a post-graduate diploma in Educational Psychology at Massey University (2001), and a PhD in Educational Psychology at Monash University (2015).

== Academic career ==
Alefaio-Tugia registered as one of New Zealand's first Samoan-descended educational psychologists in 2001 and joined Massey University's School of Psychology, rising to Associate Professor and Associate Dean Pacific. Her appointment to Otago in 2024 made her the university's inaugural Pacific professor of psychology, charged with growing Pacific research capacity and culturally responsive training.

Beyond academia, she founded NIUPatCH (Navigate In Unity: Pacific Approaches to Community-Humanitarianism) in 2016 and created the TalanoaHUBBS symposium series linking Pacific communities with researchers.

Alefaio-Tugia's scholarship centres on Pacific world-views of well-being, disaster response and community resilience. Her Rutherford Discovery Fellowship project (2020–2025) reframes humanitarian psychology through Pacific-diasporic practices of disaster relief. As a Fulbright New Zealand Scholar (2023), she collaborated with the National Disaster Preparedness Training Centre, University of Hawai‘i, and Brown University's Center for Human Rights and Humanitarian Studies on Pacific-diasporic disaster resilience.

== Honours ==
- Rutherford Discovery Fellowship (Royal Society Te Apārangi, 2020)
- Fulbright New Zealand Scholar Award (2023)

== Selected works ==
- Alefaio-Tugia, S. Pacific-Indigenous Psychology: Galuola, A NIU-Wave of Psychological Practices. Springer, 2022.Pacific-Indigenous Psychology. Springer. 2022. ISBN 978-3-031-14431-8.
- Alefaio-Tugia, S. “Galuola: A NIU way for informing psychology from the cultural context of Fa‘a Samoa.” PhD thesis, Monash University, 2015.Siautu Alefaio-Tugia (2015). Galuola: A NIU way for informing psychology from the cultural context of Fa‘a Samoa (PhD). Monash University.
