= Gabor Kereszturi =

Hungarian-New Zealand volcanologist and remote-sensing scientist

Gábor Kereszturi
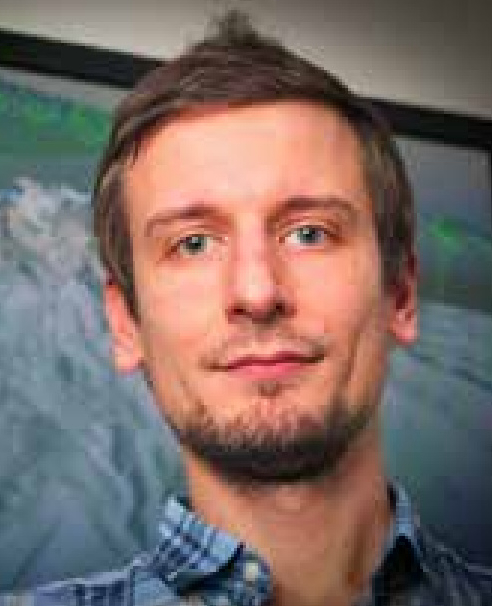
- Kereszturi in 2018
- Born: Hungary
- Citizenship: Hungary • New Zealand
- Education: University of Miskolc (MSc); Massey University (PhD)
- Known for: Hyperspectral remote sensing of active and dormant volcanoes
- Awards: Rutherford Discovery Fellowship (2020); Massey University Early Career Research Medal (2021)
- Scientific career
- Fields: Volcanology, remote sensing, geomorphology
- Workplaces: Massey University
- Thesis: Approaches to forecast volcanic hazard in the Auckland Volcanic Field, New Zealand (2014)
- Doctoral advisor: Károly Németh

Gábor Kereszturi is a Hungarian-born Earth scientist who specialises in applying hyperspectral and other remote-sensing techniques to map volcanic terrains and assess related hazards. He is an associate professor of Earth science in the School of Agriculture and Environment at Massey University in Palmerston North and the recipient of a 2020 Rutherford Discovery Fellowship from the Royal Society Te Apārangi.

== Education ==
Kereszturi earned an MSc in Geography (Geoinformatics) from the University of Miskolc in Hungary. He moved to New Zealand in 2010 to begin doctoral research at Massey University and completed a PhD in Earth science in 2014. His thesis combined LiDAR, field mapping and numerical lava-flow simulations to improve eruption forecasts for the Auckland Volcanic Field.

== Career ==
After post-doctoral work on airborne hyperspectral imaging, Kereszturi joined Massey University’s staff in 2017 as a lecturer, became senior lecturer in 2019 and associate professor in 2023. His research links geological fieldwork with satellite, airborne and laboratory spectroscopy to characterise hydrothermal alteration and develop early-warning tools for volcano instability. He co-leads the Volcanogenic Sediment Commission of the International Association of Volcanology and Chemistry of the Earth’s Interior (IAVCEI) and serves as an associate editor of the New Zealand Journal of Geology and Geophysics.

In mid‑2025, Kereszturi was appointed lead investigator on a New Zealand–NASA partnership project, awarded over NZD 1 million in funding, to develop space‑based geothermal monitoring tools. The initiative uses a combination of thermal, hyperspectral, and radar satellite data (from NASA’s ECOSTRESS and EMIT sensors aboard the ISS and ESA’s Sentinel‑1) to assess vegetation stress as an indicator of geothermal activity. It is the first project worldwide to apply such integrated remote‑sensing techniques for geothermal surveillance. The project also incorporates Mātauranga Māori (Indigenous knowledge systems) to enrich environmental stewardship models.

== Honours and awards ==
- Rutherford Discovery Fellowship (Royal Society Te Apārangi, 2020)
- Early Career Research Medal, Massey University (University-wide, 2021)

== Selected publications ==
- Kereszturi, G.; Heap, M.; Schaefer, L. N. et al. (2023). “Porosity, strength, and alteration – Towards a new volcano stability assessment tool using VNIR–SWIR reflectance spectroscopy.” Earth and Planetary Science Letters 602: 117929. doi:10.1016/j.epsl.2022.117929
- Vicente, J.; Mead, S.; Kereszturi, G. et al. (2025). “Simulation of the 2012 Te Maari debris avalanche: insight into failure mechanics and the role of the hydrothermal system.” Journal of Volcanology and Geothermal Research 465.
- Kereszturi, G. et al. (2025). “Understanding the evolution of scoria-cone morphology using multivariate models.” Communications Earth & Environment 6: 439. doi:10.1038/s43247-025-02425-8
