= Rosie Bradshaw =

New Zealand mycologist

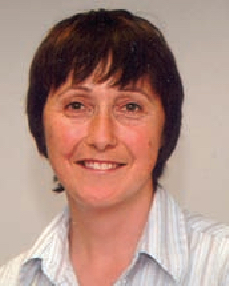
- Education: University of Nottingham
- Scientific career
- Fields: Mycology
- Workplaces: Massey University
- Thesis: Hybridization of Aspergillus species (1983)

Rosemary E. Bradshaw is a New Zealand mycologist, as of 2019 full professor of genetics at the Massey University.

== Academic career ==
After a 1983 PhD titled 'Hybridization of Aspergillus species' at the University of Nottingham, Bradshaw moved to the Massey University, rising to full professor in 2016.

Bradshaw's best-known work involved the identification of the oomycete Phytophthora agathadicida as the cause of Kauri dieback.

== Selected works ==
- Ohm, Robin A., Nicolas Feau, Bernard Henrissat, Conrad L. Schoch, Benjamin A. Horwitz, Kerrie W. Barry, Bradford J. Condon et al. "Diverse lifestyles and strategies of plant pathogenesis encoded in the genomes of eighteen Dothideomycetes fungi." PLoS Pathogens 8, no. 12 (2012): e1003037.
- De Wit, Pierre JGM, Ate Van Der Burgt, Bilal Ökmen, Ioannis Stergiopoulos, Kamel A. Abd-Elsalam, Andrea L. Aerts, Ali H. Bahkali et al. "The genomes of the fungal plant pathogens Cladosporium fulvum and Dothistroma septosporum reveal adaptation to different hosts and lifestyles but also signatures of common ancestry." PLoS genetics 8, no. 11 (2012): e1003088.
- Groenewald, Marizeth, Irene Barnes, Rosie E. Bradshaw, Anna V. Brown, Angie Dale, Johannes Z. Groenewald, Kathy J. Lewis, Brenda D. Wingfield, Michael J. Wingfield, and Pedro W. Crous. "Characterization and distribution of mating type genes in the Dothistroma needle blight pathogens." Phytopathology 97, no. 7 (2007): 825–834.
- Bradshaw, Rosie E., Deepak Bhatnagar, Rebecca J. Ganley, Carmel J. Gillman, Brendon J. Monahan, and Janet M. Seconi. "Dothistroma pini, a forest pathogen, contains homologs of aflatoxin biosynthetic pathway genes." Appl. Environ. Microbiol. 68, no. 6 (2002): 2885–2892.
