= Molecular Ecology Resources =

- Discipline: Ecology
- Language: English
- Edited by: Shawn Narum

Publication details
- Former name(s): Molecular Ecology Notes
- History: 2001–present
- Publisher: Wiley-Blackwell
- Frequency: Monthly
- Impact factor: 8.678 (2021)

Standard abbreviations
- ISO 4: Mol. Ecol. Resour.

Indexing
- ISSN: 1755-0998

Links
- Journal homepage

Molecular Ecology Resources is a monthly scientific journal covering development of tools and techniques to address questions in ecology, evolution, behavior, and conservation. It is the companion journal of Molecular Ecology and is published by Wiley-Blackwell. From 2001 to 2007, it was published under the name Molecular Ecology Notes. Its 2017 impact factor is 7.059.
