= Wendi Roe =

New Zealand veterinary pathologist and marine mammal researcher

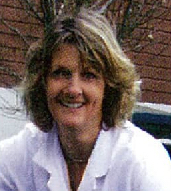
- Roe, c. 2013
- Born: Wendi Dianne Roe
- Education: University of Waikato
- Alma mater: Massey University
- Scientific career
- Institutions: Massey University
- Thesis: A study of brain injury in New Zealand sea lion pups (2012)
- Doctoral advisor: Joe Mayhew, Bob Jolly and Christine Thomson

Wendi Dianne Roe is a New Zealand veterinary pathologist who specialises in researching marine mammals. She is Professor of Veterinary and Marine Mammal Pathology and Deputy Head of the School of Veterinary Science at Massey University.

== Academic career ==
Roe completed a BSc at the University of Waikato in 1984. She moved to Massey University where she undertook a Bachelor of Veterinary Science (1990). Following graduation, she practised as a veterinarian for ten years in both New Zealand and England. She then studied veterinary pathology at Massey University and later graduated with a PhD. Her thesis was titled A study of brain injury in New Zealand sea lion pups (2012). Roe was promoted to full professor at Massey, effective 1 January 2020.

== Selected works ==
- Mackie, J. T.; Blyde, D; Harris, L; Roe, W. D.; Keyburn, A. I. (February 2020). "Brucellosis associated with stillbirth in a bottlenose dolphin in Australia". Australian Veterinary Journal. 98 (3): 92–95. doi:10.1111/avj.12903. ISSN 0005-0423. PMID 32030727. S2CID 211047166.
- French, Adrienne F.; Castillo-Alcala, Fernanda; Gedye, Kristene R.; Roe, Wendi D.; Gartrell, Brett D. (April 2020). "Nematode larva migrans caused by Toxocara cati in the North Island brown kiwi (Apteryx mantelli)". International Journal for Parasitology: Parasites and Wildlife. 11: 221–228. doi:10.1016/j.ijppaw.2020.02.011. PMC 7066032. PMID 32181127.
- Bojanić, Krunoslav; Acke, Els; Roe, Wendi D.; Marshall, Jonathan C.; Cornelius, Angela J.; Biggs, Patrick J.; Midwinter, Anne C. (29 August 2020). "Comparison of the Pathogenic Potential of Campylobacter jejuni, C. upsaliensis and C. helveticus and Limitations of Using Larvae of Galleria mellonella as an Infection Model". Pathogens. 9 (9): 713. doi:10.3390/pathogens9090713. ISSN 2076-0817. PMC 7560178. PMID 32872505.
- French, Adrienne F.; Castillo-Alcala, Fernanda; Gedye, Kristene R.; Knox, Matthew A.; Roe, Wendi D.; Gartrell, Brett D. (December 2020). "Ventral dermatitis in rowi (Apteryx rowi) caused by cutaneous capillariasis". International Journal for Parasitology: Parasites and Wildlife. 13: 160–170. doi:10.1016/j.ijppaw.2020.10.003. PMC 7581817. PMID 33117650.
