= Siouxsie Wiles =

New Zealand microbiologist

Siouxsie Wiles MNZM
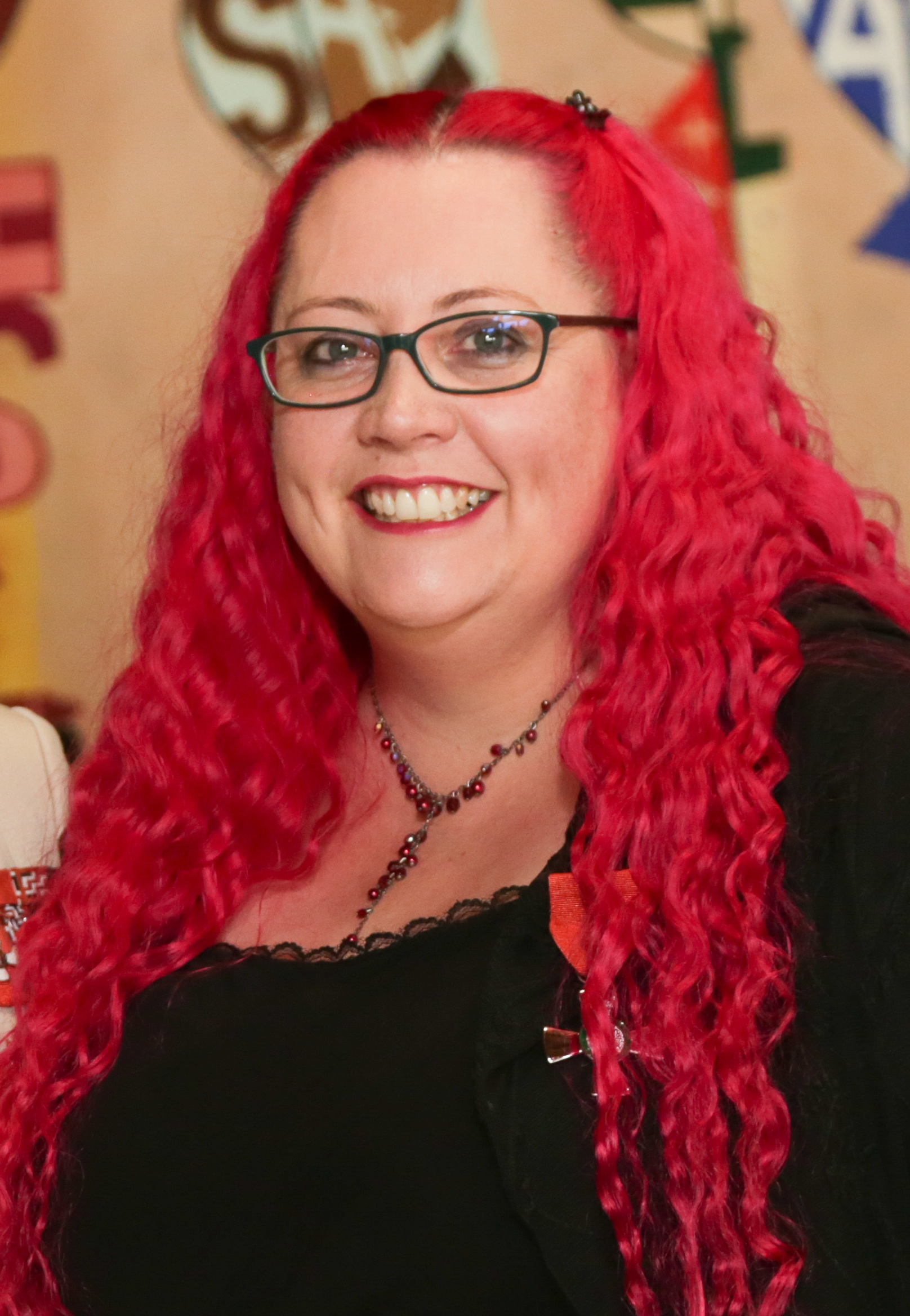
- Wiles after her investiture as MNZM in 2019
- Born: Susanna Wiles; United Kingdom
- Education: University of Edinburgh
- Known for: Director of the Bioluminescent Superbugs Lab; Author of Antibiotic Resistance: The End of Modern Medicine? Book
- Spouse: Steven Galbraith
- Children: 1
- Awards: 3Rs Prize (NC3Rs) (2005); Prime Minister's Prize for Science Media Communication (2013); Callaghan Medal (2013); Blake Medal (2016); New Zealand Skeptics' Skeptic of the Year Award (2016); New Zealander of the Year (2021)
- Scientific career
- Fields: Microbiology, science education
- Workplaces: University of Auckland
- Website: about.me/skeptimoo

Siouxsie Wiles MNZM (born Susanna Wiles) is a British microbiologist. Her specialist areas are infectious diseases and bioluminescence. She is based in New Zealand. She is the head of University of Auckland's Bioluminescent Superbugs Lab.

== Early life ==
Wiles was born in the United Kingdom and grew up in the UK and South Africa. Her mother is a retired social worker and her father is a business owner.

== Education ==
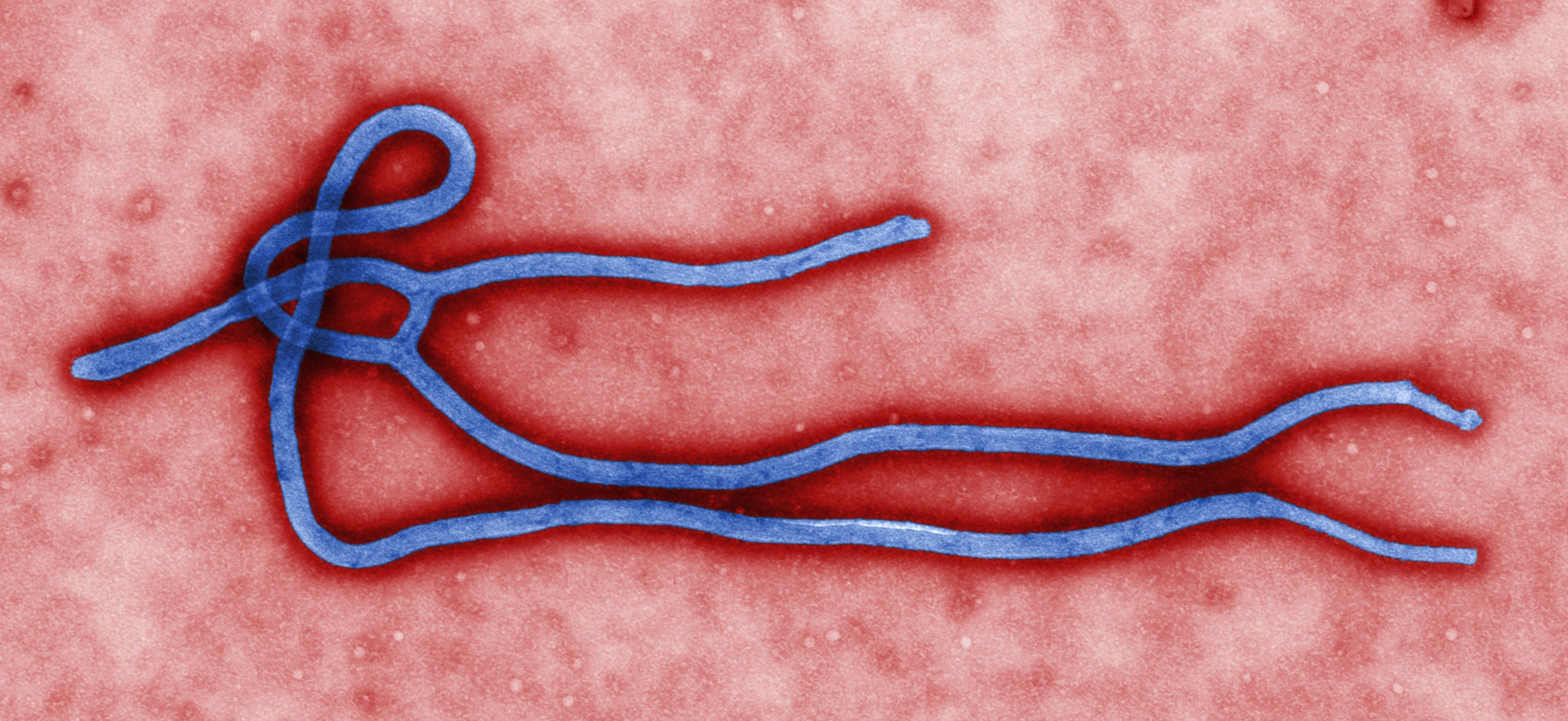
Ebola virus virion

Ebola was the microbe that started Wiles' interest in microbiology when she was a teenager. During her TEDxChristchurch talk in 2015 she said:

"This is the microbe that got me hooked on microbiology in the first place, because it's both amazing and utterly terrifying. I was a teenager when I first read about Ebola and all I could think of was: How does this turn the human body into a virus producing factory?"

The book The Hot Zone by Richard Preston, which focuses on Ebola, was what made Wiles focus her education on medical microbiology.

Wiles studied at the University of Edinburgh and graduated in 1997 with a BSc(Hons) in medical microbiology. While an undergraduate, she received a Nuffield Scholarship and worked in the university's School of Biological Sciences. Wiles received her PhD from Edinburgh Napier University, conducting research at the Centre for Ecology and Hydrology (previously known as the Institute of Virology and Environmental Microbiology), which is located in Oxford.

During her PhD Wiles first used bioluminescence to create biosensors to monitor the health of environmentally beneficial microbes.

== Professional life ==
After completing her PhD, Wiles moved to Imperial College London for a post-doctoral research position on tuberculosis. In 2007 she became a lecturer at Imperial College's Department of Infectious Diseases and Immunity, and in 2009 was awarded a Sir Charles Hercus Fellowship from the Health Research Council of New Zealand and moved to the University of Auckland. Wiles is the head of the university's Bioluminescent Superbugs Lab.

In 2013 she won the Prime Minister's Prize for Science Media Communication which includes prize money of NZ$100,000.

Wiles started the company Brightenz that sells kits with which one can create bioluminescent art at home.

In 2018 Wiles became science ambassador for House of Science, a not-for-profit venture for raising science literacy in local communities. She was also reelected as general Councillor of the Royal Society Te Apārangi in 2018. Two years later she was on the list of the BBC's 100 Women announced on 23 November 2020.

Wiles is also working on finding new antibiotics by screening 10,000 New Zealand fungi for possible medical use.

=== Bioluminescent Superbugs Lab ===
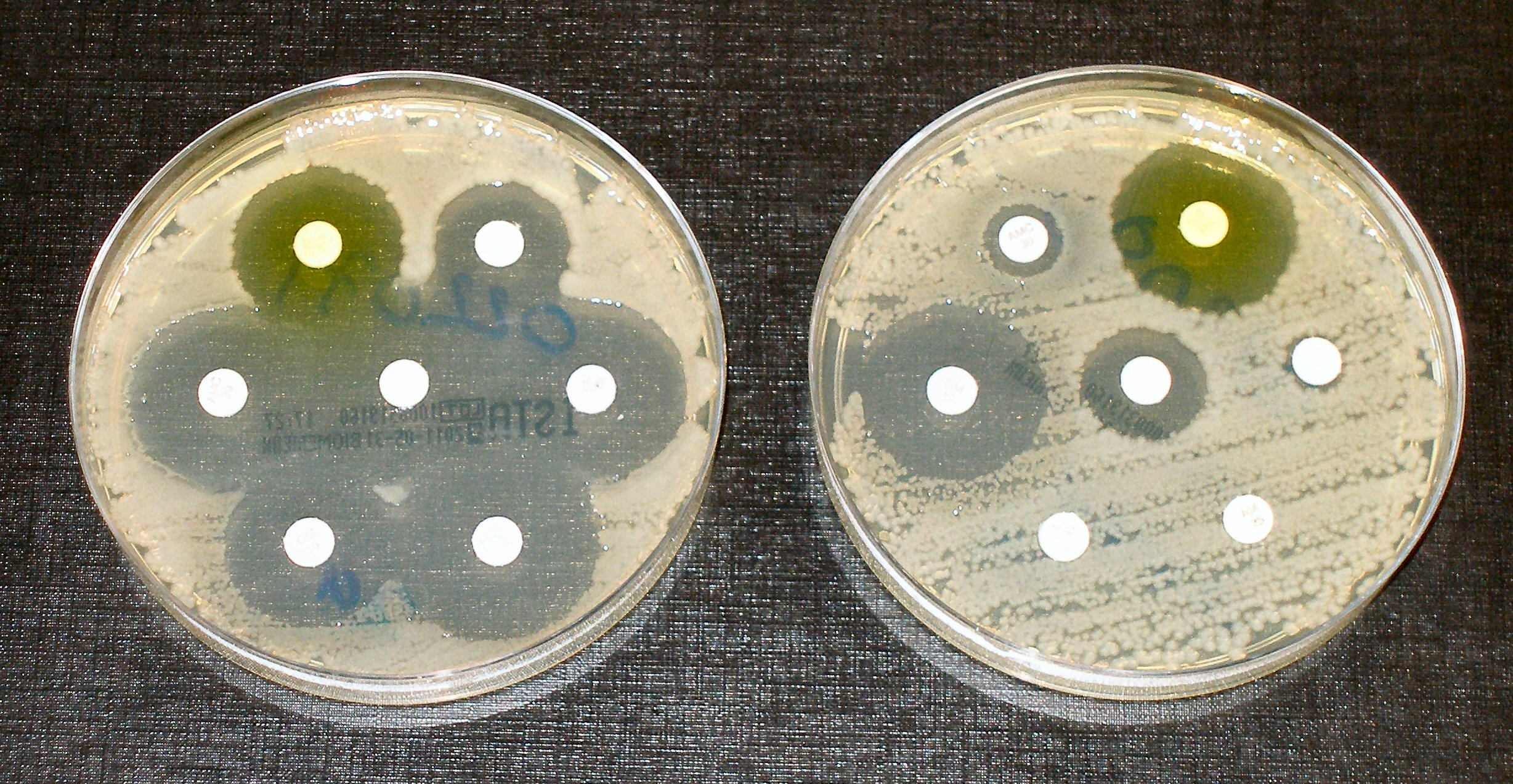
Antibiotic resistant bacteria

Wiles leads the Bioluminescent Superbugs Lab at the University of Auckland which focuses on how glowing bacteria can advance the understanding of microbial infections such as food poisoning, tuberculosis and hospital superbugs.

The bioluminescence is used to speed up the process of developing new antibiotics utilising the light emitted from the bacteria, because only living bacteria emit light. About her work Wiles says "My career has been built on making nasty bacteria bioluminescent and using them for all sorts of things, including finding new medicines". New Zealand has some of the highest rates of infectious diseases among developed countries. Globally 700,000 people die each year from drug-resistant diseases.

=== Science communication ===
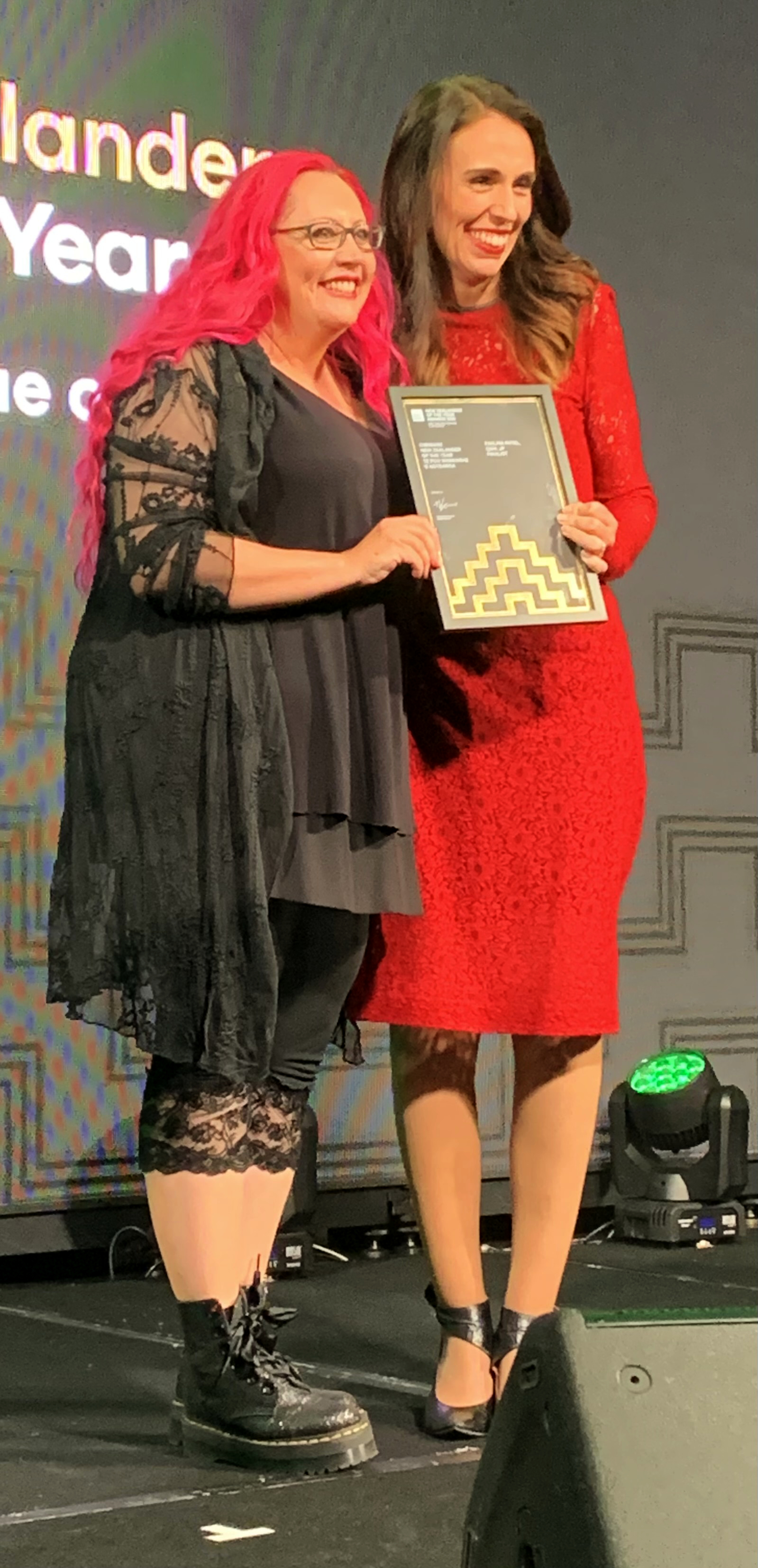
Siousxie Wiles and Prime Minister Jacinda Ardern

Wiles is passionate about demystifying science for the general public. She is an active blogger on Sciblogs.co.nz, an online podcaster, a commentator on Radio New Zealand and appears on TV shows to discuss science stories in the news. She was one of the eight scientists who fronted the "Great New Zealand Science Project", the New Zealand government's public engagement programme leading to the National Science Challenges in 2012.

She commissioned, co-wrote, and appeared with her daughter in the TVNZ online children's science show Siouxsie & Eve Investigate.

From 2010 until 2016 Wiles was co-host of the Completely Unnecessary Skeptical Podcast which focused on skepticism in New Zealand.

She has also used art and film to communicate scientific ideas: in 2011 she collaborated with Australian graphic artist Luke Harris to produce a series of animated films featuring bioluminescent creatures and their uses in science. The animations on NASA's use of fireflies for the search of extraterrestrial life was selected for inclusion in the 6th Imagine Science Film Festival in New York in 2013, and the Goethe Institute's 2014 Science Film Festival. Wiles collaborated with artist Rebecca Klee on an installation at the Auckland Art in the Dark Festival in 2013, which featured Hawaiian bobtail squid and Aliivibrio fischeri. Wiles thinks that relevant science education should start in primary school, for increasing science literacy and interest in the field more generally.

Flatten the Curve: How simple public health measures save lives from Coronavirus disease 2019

Her 2015 science communication projects include the Biolumination II exhibition.

Wiles is active in the skeptical movement having received the Skeptic of the Year Award from the New Zealand Skeptics in 2016 and attended several NZ Skeptic Conferences. She has also spoken out against anti-vaxxers and other public health related issues.

In 2018, Wiles was named as a finalist for New Zealander of the Year Awards for her work on antibiotic-resistant superbugs and infectious diseases. She won the award in 2021 for her leadership in the public communication of New Zealand's COVID-19 response.

==== COVID-19 pandemic ====
Wiles has been at the forefront of science communication in New Zealand during the COVID-19 pandemic. With cartoonist Toby Morris Wiles created "Flatten the Curve", an animated GIF comic, for The Spinoff to describe how simple citizen actions could vastly reduce the death toll. The comic went viral and was seen worldwide. Called "the defining chart of the coronavirus", it was based on earlier graphics by the Centers for Disease Control and Prevention, Rosamund Pearce of The Economist, and Thomas Jefferson University professor Drew Harris.

In 2020 Wiles was the subject of a documentary short entitled "Siouxsie and the Virus". Wiles was the subject of a second documentary in 2023 which highlighted the importance of science communication during a pandemic.

In mid-September 2021, Wiles criticised the New Zealand Government's decision to abandon its COVID-19 elimination strategy, asserting that this would put the unvaccinated and vulnerable at risk. During the launch of the COVID-19 Protection Framework (traffic light system) in December 2021, Wiles urged Aucklanders to put aside their summer holiday plans in order to contain the spread of the Delta variant within the community.

In mid September 2022, Wiles criticised the Government's decision to drop the "traffic light system" as a "big, long term expensive, mistake." She argued that the COVID-19 Protection Framework was needed to protect the country from newer COVID-19 strains, infection waves, and the problem of "Long COVID" among vulnerable patients. Wiles also argued that facemasks and RAT tests were still needed to curb the spread of COVID-19 within the community.

==== Listener Seven controversy ====
In late July 2021, Wiles and physicist Professor Shaun Hendy wrote an open counter-letter dissenting with seven fellow University of Auckland academics (Kendall Clements, Elizabeth Rata, Doug Elliffe, Garth Cooper, Robert Nola, John Werry, and Michael Corballis), who had penned a letter in the New Zealand Listener current affairs magazine arguing that mātauranga Māori (Māori indigenous knowledge) was incompatible with science. In their response, Wiles and Hendy argued that mātauranga Māori complemented Western knowledge systems. They also claimed that the diminishing role of indigenous knowledge in science was "simply another tool for exclusion and exploitation" and that mistrust in science was fuelled by scientific racism, colonialism, and injustice. By 30 July, Hendry and Wiles' counter-letter had attracted more than 2,000 unverified signatures.

In March 2022 the New Zealand Media Council upheld a complaint that a column by Wiles published by Stuff on 20 December 2021 about the Listener Seven had breached press standards. The Media Council took particular issue with Wiles' claim that the seven professors had intimidated junior colleagues with lawyers' letters.

=== Wiles v University of Auckland ===
In January 2022 Wiles and Shaun Hendy filed claims with the Employment Relations Authority against the University of Auckland. They alleged that the university did not protect them from harassment for their COVID-19 commentary advocacy for vaccination. Concerns were first raised in April 2020, and over 60 safety concern emails had been sent in total. It was not until June 2022 that the university carried out a threat assessment. Harassment experienced by the two were via email and social media, and included doxing and threats of physical confrontation. Wiles had been compared to Adolf Hitler and Satanists, and also had threats of being hung, raped, executed, and sentenced to long jail terms. After her personal details were published on a far-right social media platform, the university offered Wiles a home security system, Wiles said that it did not work properly, and when asked for help, the university said that the person had gone on Christmas holiday. They also alleged that the university breached their academic staff collective agreement, good faith requirements, and responsive communication. The university denied any wrongdoing, and said that the Wiles and Hendy are not required or expected to provide COVID-19 commentary under their employment. Auckland University instructed them to keep COVID-19 commentary to a minimum. In October 2022 Hendy resolved the dispute after leaving the university.

In August 2021, the university had advised them to reduce their public commentary and social media interaction, which Hendy and Wiles regarded as insufficient. The Employment Relations Authority also expedited their complaint, allowing it to proceed to the Employment Court, and ordered the University of Auckland to pay their legal fees.

On 6 November 2023 a hearing started in court with an expected duration of three weeks. That day, footage of harassment against Wiles was shown in court. Such clips included conspiracy theorists Billy Te Kahika and Vinny Eastwood describing her as "Satanic" to their followers. During cross-examination on 7 October, the University of Auckland's lawyer Philip Skelton disputed Wiles' claim that the university had silenced her by arguing that she had taken part in numerous media interviews. On 7 November, a person sought to speak to Wiles at the University of Auckland. On 9 November, security staff removed a man who approached Wiles' legal team at the Employment Court, claiming he wanted to give evidence to her team. In response to these incidents, University lawyers raised concerns that media coverage of the court case could create a health and safety issue.

At the end of the case, on 23 November 2023, Judge Holden reserved her decision. On 8 July 2024, the Employment Court ruled in Wiles' favour and found that the university had breached its health and safety obligations, contractual obligations, its duty of "good faith" and upheld Wiles' personal grievance claim. The Court also ruled that the university did not breach her academic freedom. The University was ordered to pay Wiles' NZ$20,000 in damages. On 4 June 2025, Radio New Zealand reported that the Employment Court had ordered the University of Auckland to pay Wiles $205,059.94 in legal costs for breaching their contractual obligations to protect Wiles from harassment.

== Books and publications ==
=== Antibiotic Resistance ===
Wiles' book Antibiotic Resistance: The End of Modern Medicine? was published in 2017 and examined the growing global problem of antibiotic resistance. Commenting on the book, University of Otago infectious diseases expert Professor Kurt Krause described it as "a clear call to action for New Zealanders on one of the most critical issues we face". Sarah-Jane O'Connor from the Science Media Centre writes that the book "[…]Antibiotic Resistance will provide an excellent tutorial for those who know there's cause for concern but need some extra background to understand why".

== Personal life ==
Wiles is married to Steven Galbraith, a professor of mathematics at the University of Auckland, and together they have a daughter. She met her husband, a New Zealander, in London and left her position at Imperial College London to move to New Zealand in 2009. Wiles was granted New Zealand citizenship in 2014.

She is a fan of Lego and likes to play with it while being a critic of what she describes as gender bias in the Lego minifigures. She has dyed her hair since she was a teenager, and is known as the "pink-haired science lady". In a 2013 blog post, Wiles says that the name "Siouxsie" comes from singer Siouxsie Sioux, lead singer of the band Siouxsie and the Banshees.

== Awards and recognition ==
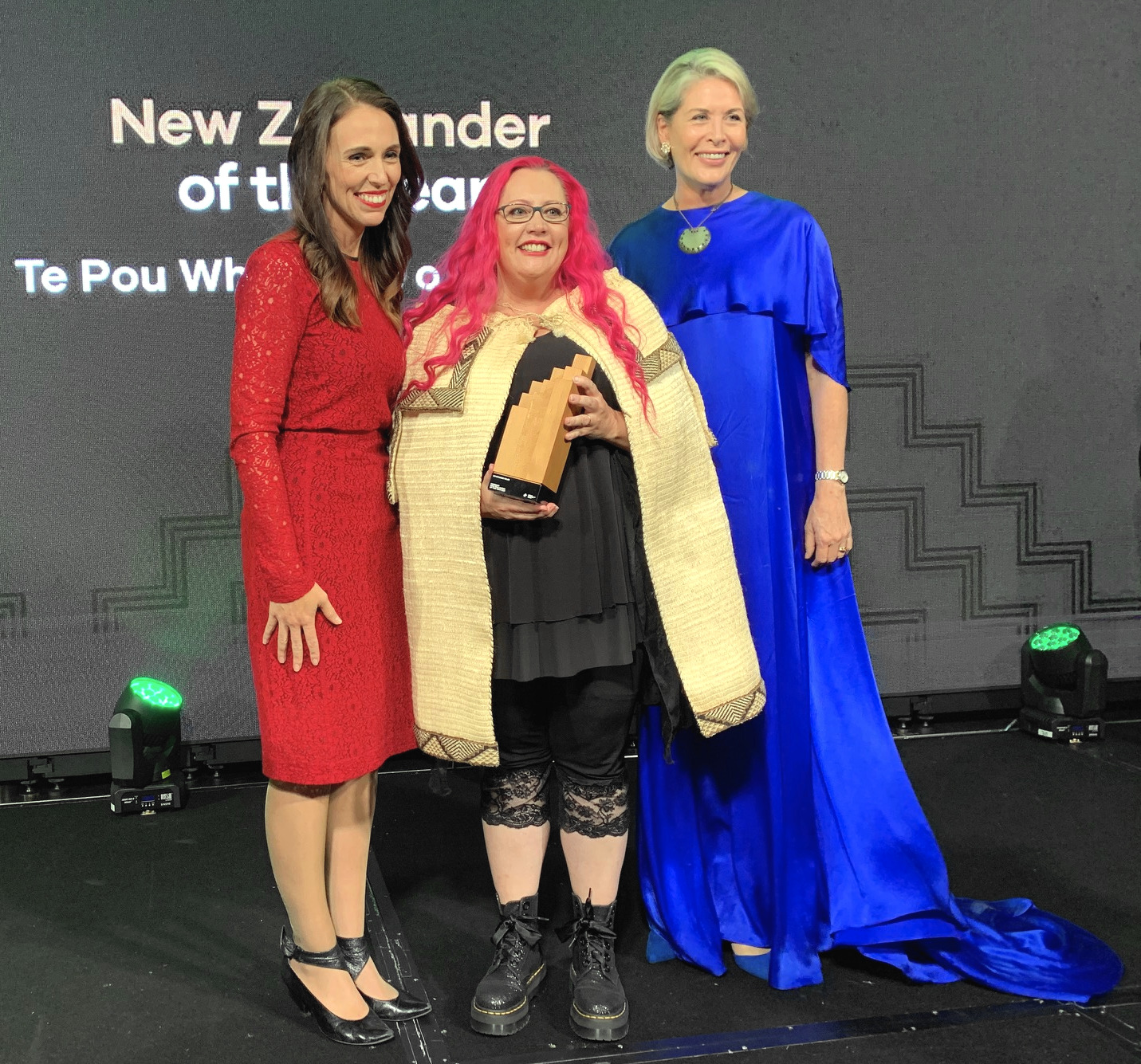
Siouxsie Wiles at the New Zealander of the Year ceremony, bracketed by Prime Minister Jacinda Ardern and Jennifer Ward-Lealand, the previous year's winner.

- 3Rs Prize from the United Kingdom National Centre for the Replacement, Refinement and Reduction of Animals in Research (NC3Rs) in 2005
- Sir Charles Hercus Health Research Fellowship from the HRC in 2009.
- New Zealand National Animal Ethics Advisory Committee Three Rs Prize, 2011
- New Zealand Association of Scientists' Science Communication Prize (now known as the Cranwell Medal), 2012
- Prime Minister's Prize for Science Media Communication, 2013
- Royal Society of New Zealand's Callaghan Medal, 2013
- Blake Leader Award from the Sir Peter Blake Trust, 2016
- New Zealand Skeptics' Skeptic of the Year Award, 2016
- Selected as one of the Royal Society Te Apārangi's "150 women in 150 words", celebrating the contributions of women to knowledge in New Zealand.
- Appointed a Member of the New Zealand Order of Merit, for services to microbiology and science communication, in the 2019 New Year Honours.
- One of BBC's "100 influential and inspirational women" for 2020 world-wide
- Supreme Winner, New Zealand Women of Influence Award, 2020
- 2021 New Zealander of the Year
- 2021 Joint winner with Al Gillespie, of Critic and Conscience of Society Award.
