= Mātauranga Māori =

Traditional knowledge of the Māori people

Mātauranga (literally Māori knowledge) is a modern term for the traditional knowledge of the Māori people of New Zealand. Māori traditional knowledge is multi-disciplinary and holistic, and there is considerable overlap between concepts. It includes environmental stewardship and economic development, with the purpose of preserving Māori culture and improving the quality of life of the Māori people over time.

The ancestors of the Māori first settled in New Zealand (Aotearoa) from other Polynesian islands in the late 13th century CE and developed a distinctive culture and knowledge-system. Mātauranga covers the entire time-period since then. Therefore, it includes oceanic navigation and other knowledge shared across the Polynesian world. Since European colonisation, beginning in the early 19th century, much mātauranga has been lost or highly influenced by Christianity and by other aspects of foreign culture. From the 1960s, mātauranga has achieved renewed importance both in Māori and wider New Zealand culture.

Mātauranga Māori has only recently gained recognition in the scientific community for including some knowledge consistent with the scientific method; it was previously perceived by scientific institutions and researchers as entirely mythological lore, entirely superseded by modern science. In the 21st century, mātauranga is often used by academics and government institutions when addressing particular environmental problems, with institutions or organisations partnering with iwi, typically with government funding.

== Etymology and meaning ==
Mātauranga Māori as a phrase became popular in the 1980s after being adopted by the New Zealand Government and in tertiary education. The term became useful in part due to the Treaty of Waitangi claims process, which included requests for the protection of traditional knowledge.

Kaupapa Māori is the foundation or principles of Māori thought. It is the governing principles from which mātauranga was created. The exact relationship of the two domains is not set: they are distinct concepts.

== History ==
Examples of mātauranga modifiers
Mātauranga -	sub-discipline
huaota	botany
hapori	sociology
tōrangapū	political science
toi	arts
hanga poti	boat building, shipwright skills

Mātauranga was traditionally preserved through spoken language, including songs, supplemented by carving, weaving, and painting, including tattoos. Since colonisation, mātauranga has been preserved and shared through writing, first by non-Māori anthropologists and missionaries, then by Māori.

When mātauranga was recorded by anthropologists, the process was hampered by their preconceptions. It was common practice to try to synthesise the geographic variation in mātauranga, leading to the creation of a single Māori oral history (e.g. the Great Fleet) and culture. Anthropologists' informants were also sometimes paid per page for information.

Māori society refers to its traditional experts in healing as tohunga. Tohunga were often the only source of medicinal knowledge and education in Māori culture. In 1907, the New Zealand Parliament passed the Tohunga Suppression Act, which made tohunga practices illegal and punishable by fines or imprisonment. The Tohunga Suppression Act was finally repealed in 1962 under the Māori Community Development Act. Although it caused in part the erasure of Māori knowledge and science, the legislation failed at large. The New Zealand Government's intent was to inhibit traditional but harmful practices, but some Māori people remained faithful to tohunga.

== Frameworks ==
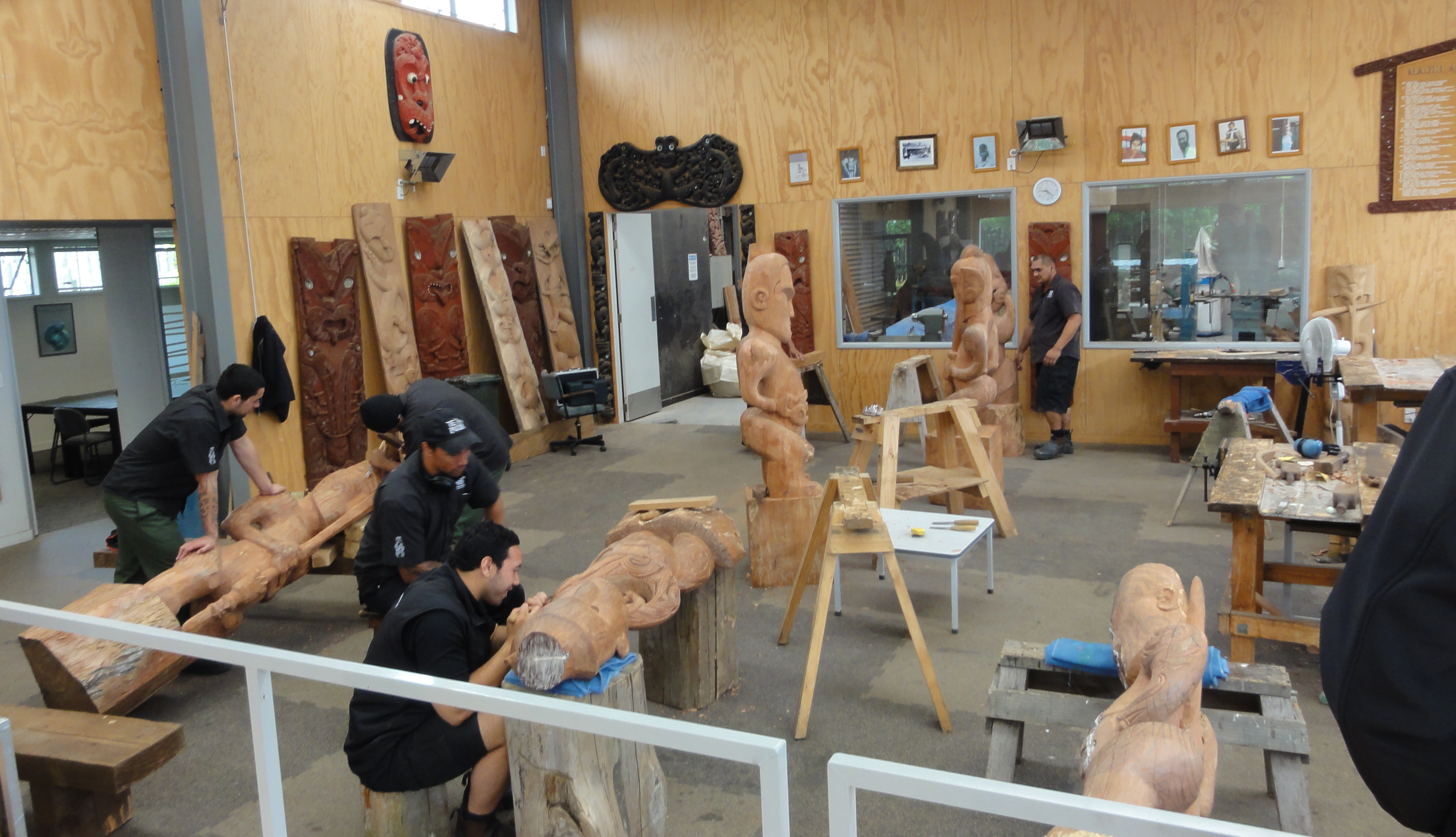
Whakarewarewa carving school used to propagate mātauranga.

As mātauranga stresses the connection of all knowledge, there is no single system for its division into sub-disciplines. Whakapapa and the Māori language (te reo Māori ) are considered key overarching concepts. Whakapapa represents the connection between the natural and human world due to its common origin. It is commonly believed that mātauranga can be best understood in its own language and is the only way to preserve mātauranga in the future.

Three common Māori well-being models
A strong house (Whare Tapa Wha)	The octopus (Te Wheke)	Supporting structures (Nga Pou Mana)
Spirituality (Wairua)	Spirituality (Wairuatanga)	Family (Whānaunga-tanga)
Mental health (Hinengaro)	Mental health (Hinengaro)	Cultural heritage (Taonga tuku iho)
Physical (Tinana)	Physical (Tinana)	Environment (Te Ao tūroa)
Family (Whānau)	Family (Whānaungatanga)	Land base (Turangawaewae)
	Uniqueness (Mana ake)	
	Vitality (Mauri)	
	Cultural heritage (Ha a koro ma a kui ma)	
	Emotions (Whatumanawa)	

== Measurement ==
=== Distance ===
There are two general types of distance measurement in mātauranga Māori: those based on the human body and those based on a measuring stick or rope. The human-based measurement system included many different units, such as 'maro' which was the span of the arms outstretched horizontally. It is suspected that these systems were only of local use due to variation between people. The 'kumi' was the length of ten 'maro', this is the only recorded multiplier in mātauranga. Our evidence for the human-based system is highly reliant on the research of anthropologist Elsdon Best.

The measuring-rod (rauru) was a way of preserving a particular human dimension. Some rauru were passed down through the generations as sacred objects and recorded the dimensions of import ancestors. Ropes were also used in measurement, particularly in the construction of a building's floor plans.

Selection of traditional human based measurements
Name	Length of
Pakihiwi	Shoulder to fingertips
Tuke	Elbow to the fingertips
Kōiti	Little finger
Kōnui	First joint of thumb
Ringa	Width of the hand
Awanui	Width of two hands (fingers closed) plus length of thumbs (outstretched with their tips touching)
Matikara	Span of outspread fingers from the tip of the thumb to the tip of the little finger

=== Time ===
Mātauranga uses astronomical observations, primarily of the Sun and Moon to measure time. The Moon's phases are used to define the main subdivision of the year (maramataka). The timing of the New Year varied regionally across New Zealand, but was often based around the Pleiades star cluster (Matariki). Some iwi, for example, used the first new moon after the appearance of Matariki as the start of the new year. The different lunar cycles of the year and the four recognised seasons were used to plan agriculture and activities such as fishing.

== The natural world ==
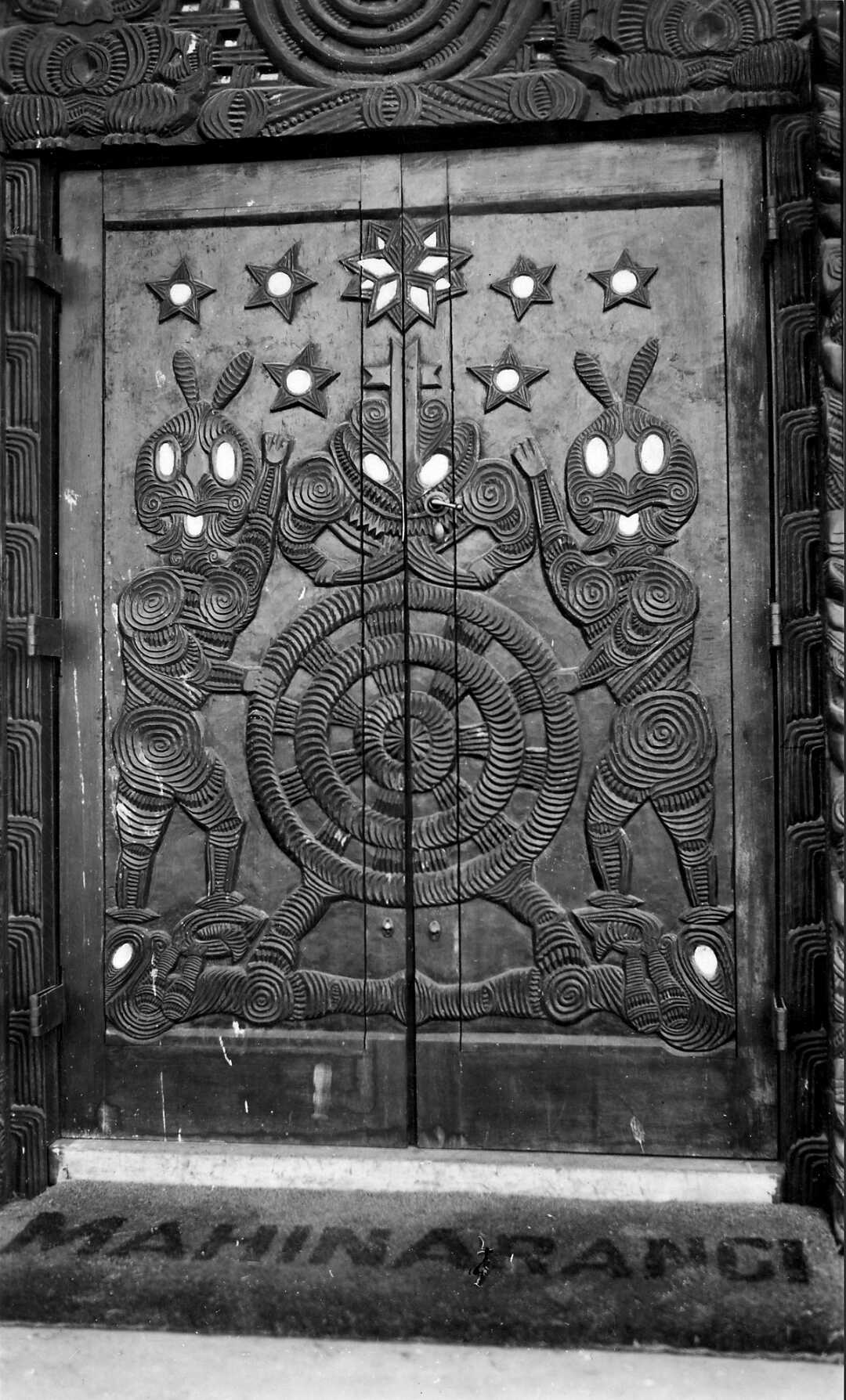
Wooden carved door displaying the coat of arms for the Māori kings (Te Paki o Matariki), which includes a depiction of the constellation Matariki (Pleiades).

The earth mother Papatūānuku and land (whenua) are also the names for a placenta. Genealogies are often used to show the connection between natural phenomena. For example Parawhenuamea (the personification of water) married her brother Putoto. Their son Rakahore married Hinekuku (the clay maiden), their children were Tuamatua (guardian of rocks found on the sea shore) and Whatuaho (greywacke and chert) and Papakura (volcanic rocks).

Rocks that had practical utility (mana) like jade (pounamu) or metasomatised sedimentary rock (pakohe) were mostly sourced from rivers and the sea shore. However, throughout the mountains of the South Island outcrops were also quarried.

Soil maintenance and modification were common for horticulture. This included adding gravel or sand for drainage and seaweed for fertiliser. Mātauranga concern for soil is also shown by there being more than 33 known names for different kinds of soil.

=== Cultivation of kūmara ===
By the time that European settlers arrived, Māori had large plantations of kūmara growing in many parts of New Zealand. According to Māori oral history, kūmara were not on board the original canoes that settled New Zealand, but were introduced following multiple return voyages into the Pacific. Kūmara were traditionally grown as far south as Banks Peninsula. This is approximately 1,000 km further south than kūmara had been grown anywhere else in the world. The variety grown by Māori prior to the 19th century had a white skin and whitish flesh, unlike today's purple or orange-skinned varieties. The pre-European varieties grown by Māori can be left in the ground year-round in the tropics, but in the cool conditions of New Zealand, the tubers will spoil if left in cold soil over winter and spring. A wide range of techniques were developed to ensure reliable production, including careful choice of growing locations, drainage, the application of mulch and other materials to increase soil temperatures, the construction of walls to shelter the crop from the wind, and the lifting and careful storage of tubers during winter.

=== Notable people ===
One notable woman was Wahakaotirangi, whose name translates to "completion from the sky". As one of New Zealand's first scientists, Wahakaotirangi brought kūmara to the Waikato region. When in Waikato, Wahakaotirangi built gardens in which she experimented with growing edible and medicinal plants, in particular studying how to make the kūmara grow in its cooler climate. This was an essential innovation for the Tainui people of Waikato, as it provided them with a reliable and sustainable source of food. Wahakaotirangi was also a part of the invention and launch of the Tainui canoe.

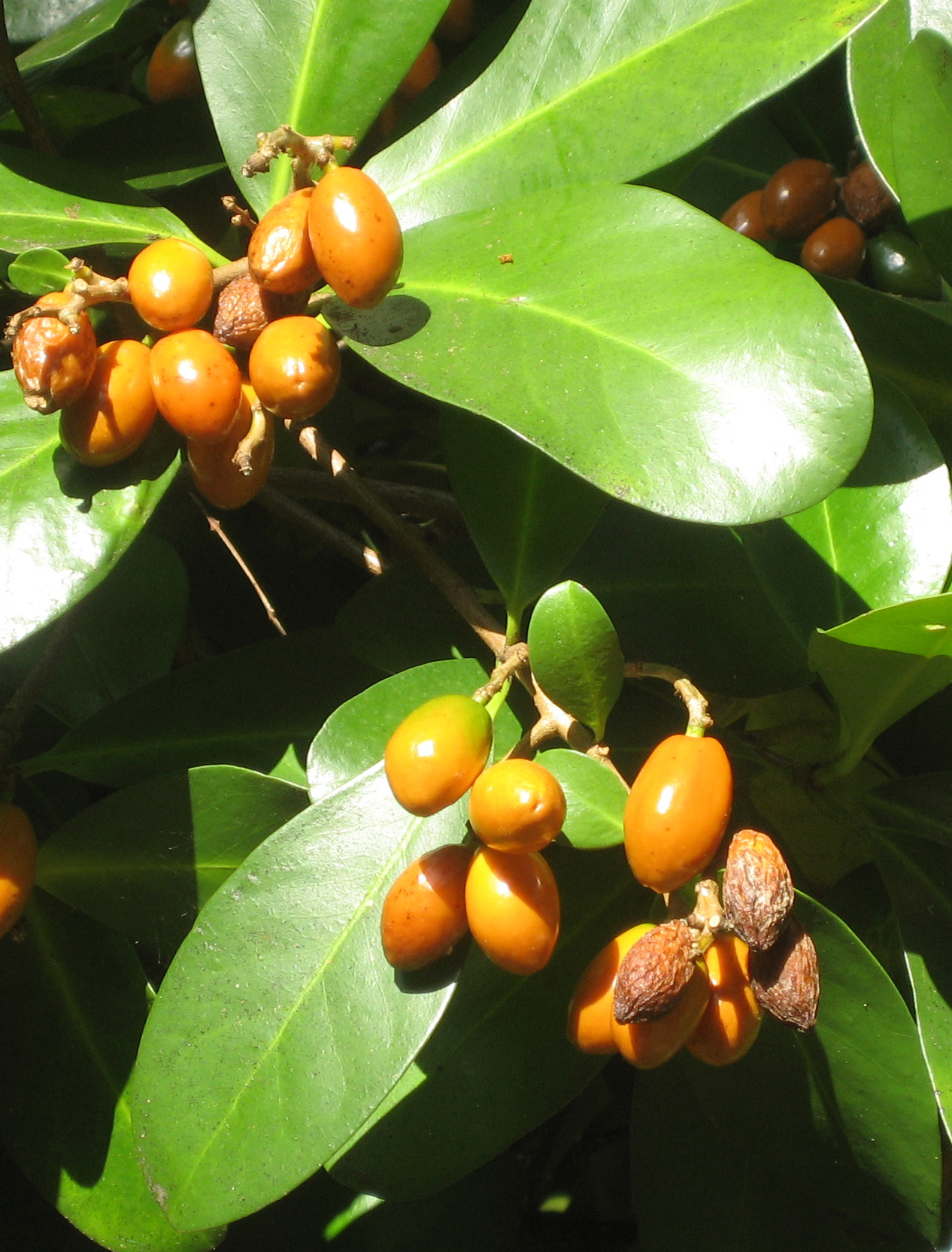
Karaka fruit can cause paralysis when eaten. To avoid this Māori would cook them and then soak them in water. William Skey isolated the poisonous compound, which was shown to be destroyed at temperatures over 100°C.

Another notable woman was Pirongia-te-aroaro-ō-Kahu, more commonly known as Kahupeka. Following her husband's death and her own illness, she journeyed across King Country and studied the medicinal uses of native plants such as harakeke, koromiko, kawakawa, and rangiora. Kahupeka's experiments helped the Māori people towards properly utilising hundreds of different medicinal plants.

== Modern practice ==
Mātauranga has a strong influence on the thought of most Māori today.

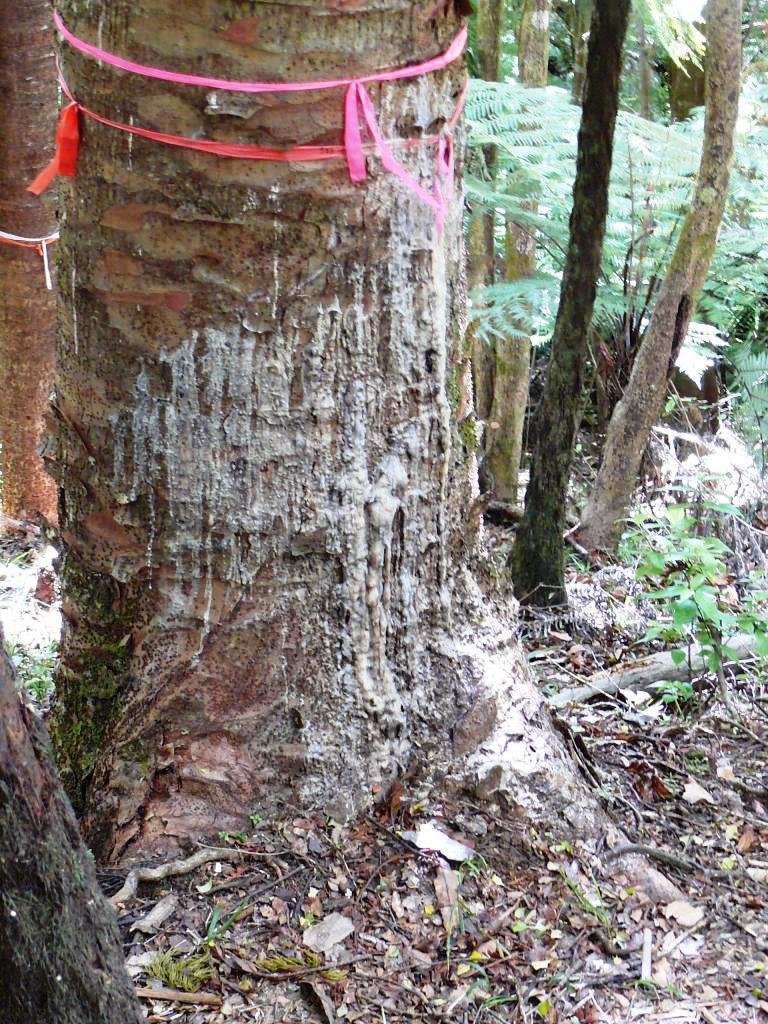
Mātauranga is being employed in treating kauri dieback.

Most traditional Māori science is now focused on particular practical problems, with science-based organisations partnering with iwi, typically with government funding. Outputs include traditional scientific publications, as well as concrete benefits for iwi. Some examples include the geothermal toxicity in food and identifying novel antimicrobial compounds.

Traditional Māori science had major impacts on pre-colonial New Zealand. For example, Wahakaotirangi's innovations in agriculture ensured the formation and survival of the Tainui people. This influence persists, and is seen in such cases as the New Zealand Department of Conservation’s Biodiversity Strategy, which states that by 2020, “traditional Māori knowledge, or mātauranga Māori, about biodiversity is respected and preserved and informs biodiversity management”.

== Politicisation and critique of mātauranga ==
=== Effectiveness of environmental stewardship ===
Archaeology and quaternary geology show that New Zealand's natural environment changed significantly during the period of precolonial Māori occupation. This has led some academics to question the effectiveness of Māori traditional knowledge in managing the environment. The environmental changes are similar to those following human occupation in other parts of the world, including deforestation (approximately 50%), the loss ofmegafauna, more general species extinctions and soil degradation due to agriculture. The models favoured by academics today describe precolonial Māori as accessing resources based on ease of access and energy return. This would have involved moving from one location or food source to another when the original one had become less rewarding. Historically, academic models on precolonial environmental stewardship have been closely tied to the idea of the 'Noble Savage' and the now-debunked hypothesis of multiple ethnicities being responsible for different aspects of New Zealand's archeological record.

=== Relationship to institutional science ===
After the Māori Renaissance, Māori academics campaigned for the creation of independent Māori Studies departments. There was a general sentiment that Māori mātauranga should be studied by Māori people, particularly in the fields of anthropology and archaeology. The history of traditional Māori scientific advancements is taught at a tertiary level at Victoria University of Wellington and Canterbury University.

Under colonisation Māori people, and women in particular, were treated as subjects rather than as creators of scientific knowledge, a treatment which continues to affect the sociological context of Māori women in science to this day. Notable women in the field of traditional Māori science include Makereti Papakura, who wrote a thesis on the Māori people, and Rina Winifred Moore, the first female Māori doctor in New Zealand.

In 2021, The Listener published a letter titled "In Defence of Science", co-signed by several New Zealand scientists including Douglas Elliffe, Kendall Clements, Garth Cooper, Michael Corballis, Elizabeth Rata, Robert Nola, and John Werry. The letter was in response to the proposed inclusion of mātauranga Māori in the school curriculum on equal terms with "other bodies of knowledge", with the authors arguing that mātauranga Māori "falls far short of what can be defined as science itself", and disputing "the notion that science is a Western European invention and itself evidence of European dominance over Māori and other indigenous peoples". The letter sparked a controversy and calls for expulsions from the Royal Society of New Zealand, ending with Cooper and Elliffe resigning from the society in protest. The authors were later supported by Richard Dawkins, who argued that "New Zealand children will be taught the true wonder of DNA, while being simultaneously confused by the doctrine that all life throbs with a vital force conferred by the Earth Mother and the Sky Father".

Inclusion of traditional knowledge such as mātauranga Māori in education was the subject of several 2024 articles in the journal Science. Proponents argued that indigenous knowledge can be complementary to science and includes empirical information, even encoded in myths, and that it holds equal educational value to science like the arts and humanities. They argued it should be taught alongside science, but not within the science curriculum itself. Efforts to include it in education were criticised on the grounds that it is inseparable from spiritual and religious beliefs, leading to their introduction into science classes; that it is not possible to reconcile contradictions between the two; that it comes at the cost of delivering curricula that meet international standards; that policies granting science and indigenous knowledge equal status are based on relativism and inhibit science from questioning claims made by indigenous knowledge systems; and that many proponents of indigenous knowledge engage in ideological antiscience rhetoric. The vitalist Māori concept of mauri was inserted into the New Zealand national chemistry curriculum, and the government ignored the objections of science teachers citing the 'equal status' (mana ōrite) policy. It was later removed from exam objectives after 18 months of controversy, though it still appeared in some materials afterwards.

== See also ==
- Māori and conservation
- Māori music
- Māori traditional textiles
- Medicinal plants
- Native American ethnobotany
- Pharmacognosy
- Listener letter on science

== Sources ==
- Pawson, Eric; Brooking, Tom (2013). Making a new land : environmental histories of New Zealand (New ed.). Dunedin, New Zealand: Otago University Press. ISBN 978-1-927322-55-0. OCLC 933761348.
- Best, Elsdon (2005). Forest lore of the Māori : with methods of snaring, trapping, and preserving birds and rats, uses of berries, roots, fern-root, and forest products, with mythological notes on origins, karakia used etc. Wellington, N.Z.: Te Papa Press. ISBN 978-1-877385-01-8. OCLC 156746436.
- Best, Elsdon (1996). Tūhoe, the children of the mist : a sketch of the origin, history, myths, and beliefs of the Tūhoe tribe of the Māori of New Zealand; with some account of other early tribes of the Bay of Plenty district (4th ed.). Auckland [N.Z.]: Reed. ISBN 0-7900-0445-3. OCLC 39264131.
- Crowe, Andrew (2018). Pathway of the Birds: The Voyaging Achievements of the Maori and Their Polynesian Ancestors. David Bateman Ltd. ISBN 978-1-86953-961-0.
- Howe, K (2003). The Quest for Origins - Who First Discovered and Settled New Zealand and the Pacific Islands?. Penguin Books Press. ISBN 9780143008453. OCLC 52750152.
- Reilly, Michael; Leoni, Gianna; Carter, Lyn; Duncan, Suzanne; Paterson, Lachy; Ratima, Matiu Tai (2018). Te kōparapara : an introduction to the Māori world. Auckland, New Zealand: Auckland University Press. ISBN 978-1-86940-867-1. OCLC 1031208695.
- West, Jonathan (2017). The face of nature : an environmental history of the Otago Peninsula. Dunedin, New Zealand: Otago University Press. ISBN 978-1-927322-38-3. OCLC 994517936.
