= Free Speech Union (New Zealand) =

Legal advocacy organisation in New Zealand

New Zealand Free Speech Union logo

The Free Speech Union (FSU) is an organisation that advocates for freedom of speech in New Zealand. It was formed as the Free Speech Coalition in 2018, and relaunched as the Free Speech Union in May 2021.

== Organisation and goals ==
The Free Speech Union was first established as the Free Speech Coalition in July 2018. It was formed out of the New Zealand Taxpayers' Union office by four colleagues, including lawyer, lobbyist and Taxpayers' Union founder Jordan Williams.

The Free Speech Union's stated goal is to defend and promote the free exchange of information and to educate people on the importance of free speech in New Zealand. The group has opposed hate speech legislation and censorship. Despite its connections to the right-wing Taxpayers' Union, it claims support from across the political and ideological spectrum.

The Free Speech Union is a registered trade union. It is the first sister group of the Free Speech Union of the UK and uses the name under license. Its office is next to the Taxpayers' Union office in Wellington, New Zealand.

The Free Speech Union was initially led by chief executive Jonathan Ayling, a former adviser to National Party members of Parliament David Bennett and Simeon Brown. By November 2025, the organisation was being led by chief executive Stephen Franks (a lawyer and former ACT Party) and chief executive Jillaine Heather (a former lawyer and human resources executive).

By October 2022, the union claimed 1,500 paid-up members and 70,000 supporters. By 2021, the organisation had two full-time staff based in Wellington and a part-time communications specialist. By November 2025, the FSU claimed 959 members and had six employees. Notable members and supporters of the union have included former National Party leader Judith Collins, ACT Party leader David Seymour, former Labour Party chief of staff Matt McCarten, formerly left-leaning journalist Chris Trotter, Auckland University of Technology history professor Paul Moon and University of Auckland academic and Jewish community leader David Cumin.

== Activities and campaigns ==
=== Venue booking cancellation ===
The Free Speech Coalition was established in July 2018 in response to the Mayor of Auckland Phil Goff's decision to cancel a speaking event featuring alt-right speakers Lauren Southern and Stefan Molyneux at an Auckland Council-owned venue. The Coalition twice unsuccessfully challenged the cancellation at the High Court and the Court of Appeal. For its High Court challenge, the Coalition raised NZ$150,000 from over 2,000 donors.

=== Freedom of expression ===
In November 2021, the Free Speech Union supported Otago Regional Council councillor Michael Laws, who was the subject of a code of conduct investigation over his criticism of Council staff in the Otago Daily Times newspaper. Jonathan Ayling urged Council chief executive Sarah Gardner to withdraw her complaint and called for the council's code of conduct to be amended, claiming that it was being used as a "gagging order" to silence elected councillors who were representing ratepayers. The Union also offered its support to Laws. Laws was subsequently cleared of wrongdoing by the investigation.

In May 2025, the Union defended a male Tonkin + Taylor employee facing a workplace investigation after he heckled Deputy Prime Minister and Minister for Rail Winston Peters during a press conference at Wellington Railway Station. Union spokesperson Nick Hanne wrote a letter urging Tonkin + Taylor to respect the employee's freedom of expression.

=== Hate speech ===
During the 2019 Bay of Plenty local elections, the Free Speech Coalition criticised the Rotorua Lakes District Council for investigating mayoral candidate Reynold MacPherson for hate speech after he made comments likening Councillor Tania Tapsell to the Pied Piper of Hamelin. Coalition spokesperson Dr David Cumin emphasised that the New Zealand Bill of Rights Act 1990 "clearly stated everyone had the right to freedom of expression, including the freedom to seek, receive, and impart information and opinions of any kind in any form."

In June 2021, the FSU filed two successful legal challenges on behalf of the "gender-critical" group "Speak Up For Women" to speak on public premises. In addition, the Union mobilised opposition to the Sixth Labour Government's proposed hate speech laws in 2021. 80% of the 18,000 submissions on the hate speech legislation endorsed the FSU's submission opposing the law. As a result, the proposed legislation was shelved.

In mid February 2023, the Free Speech Union warned that it would take legal action against the Rotorua Lakes District Council over plans to progress a submissions policy that would ban offensive and threatening submissions. Ayling claimed that the policy infringed on free speech. Mayor of Rotorua Tania Tapsell responded that the council would respond appropriately and disputed assertions that the submissions policy infringed on free speech.

=== Academic freedom ===
In November 2021, the Free Speech Union expressed support for seven University of Auckland academics (the so-called "Listener Seven") who had been censured by the Royal Society for writing a controversial letter in the New Zealand Listener in July 2021 disputing the scientific legitimacy of Mātauranga Māori (indigenous Māori knowledge). The Royal Society also launched an investigation of three of the "Listener Seven," who were Fellows of the Royal Society. In response, Ayling urged other academics to defend science at their "own peril" and accused the Royal Society of "abandoning its own heritage and tradition of academic freedom." In response, the Free Speech Union created an academic freedom fund in December 2021 to support two of the academics under investigation including Garth Cooper.

On 15 August 2022, the Free Speech Union released its first Annual Universities Ranking Report, which graded New Zealand universities based on whether they encouraged free speech and freedom of expression on their campus. The only university to receive a "fail grade" was Auckland University of Technology, which the organisation alleged consistently opposed free speech and did not fulfill its role as a "critic and conscience" of society.

On 18 August 2022, the Free Speech Union held a public speaking event at the University of Otago's Dunedin campus featuring former broadcaster Peter Williams, Dunedin City councillor Lee Vandervis, and National Party Member of Parliament Michael Woodhouse. MPs from the Labour and Green parties declined to participate at the FSU-sponsored event.

Between 2023 and 2025, the FSU lobbied the Sixth National Government into halting the New Zealand Law Commission's work on hate speech legislation and incorporating free speech provisions and institutional neutrality for tertiary education providers in the Education and Training (System Reform) Amendment Act 2026.

=== Drag queen storytime ===
In early March 2023, the Free Speech Union defended Avondale Library's decision to host a drag queen storytime on free speech grounds, likening it to their earlier defence of Bethlehem College in Tauranga's decision to teach the traditional view of marriage in 2022. The reading session organised by "Pride Fest Out West" had been picketed by protesters who claimed that the event promoted child grooming.

=== Legislative procedure ===
On 15 March 2024, the FSU communicated its concerns to Leader of the House Chris Bishop about the National-led coalition government's repeated use of "urgency" in its first 100 days in power. They noted that 14 laws have been passed in 17 weeks compared with average of 10 across a whole term. The FSU advised that bills passed under urgency get less scrutiny from MPs and the public, and can become law without going through the full select committee process. Further, they argued that the Government had not been mandated explicitly to pass legislation that was not included in the policy manifestos of any of the three parties in Government. In response, Bishop disagreed with the FSU's concerns that passing legislation under urgency amounted to a free speech issue and cancelled his membership.

=== Anti-gang legislation ===
In mid April 2024, the Free Speech Union joined members of the Black Power gang, the Human Rights Commission, Children and Young People's Commission and the New Zealand Law Society in criticising the National-led government's proposed Gangs Legislation Amendment Bill during its select committee stage. In his submission, Ayling expressed concern that the Bill clearly did not define "what would be considered a gang." He questioned whether climate activist groups would be classified as gangs under the legislation and expressed concern that the bill would suppress freedom of expression. 475

=== Free speech events ===
In late April 2024, Victoria University of Wellington's student magazine Salient sub-editor Henry Broadbent criticised Ayling's inclusion at a scheduled free speech event due to Ayling and the group's support for controversial anti-co-governance activist Julian Batchelor, and anti-transgender advocates Graham Linehan and Kellie-Jay Keen-Minshull ("Posie Parker"). Broadbent claimed that the FSU was defending speech that fell under the United Nations' definition of hate speech. Salient met with VUW Provost/Acting Vice Chancellor Bryony James and Director of the Office of the Vice-Chancellor Reece Moores to express their concerns. Consequently, Victoria University postponed the debate to revise the format of the free speech event. In response, Ayling reiterated that the FSU "stood up for everyone's right to speak, and he found it ironic a panel discussion on free speech risked being shut down because of threats of boycotts and protests." Following student opposition, VUW postponed the free speech event until the end of May 2024. In response, Ayling denied promoting hate speech, saying "I challenge anyone to find references to me spouting hate speech of any kind. It is simply the fact – and my opponents will admit this – that I have defended speech rights of those who they claim have expressed hate speech."

In late July 2026, Auckland Councillor Julie Fairey objected to an upcoming FSU event at the Council-owned Ellen Melville Centre, saying the group was creating "controversy and division." She criticised the presence of Free Speech Union board member Ani O'Brien due to her alleged opposition to transgender rights. In response, the Union defended O'Brien and accused Fairey of seeking to lobby people into cancelling the Ellen Melville speaking event.

=== 2024 Unsilenced conference ===
In mid-May 2024, Ayling defended the upcoming "Unsilenced: Middle New Zealand on ideology" conference at Wellington City Council's Tākina convention centre on 18 May on free speech grounds. The conference had announced Family First New Zealand leader Bob McCoskrie Destiny Church leader Brian Tamaki and former National Party MP Simon O'Connor as guest speakers. Protest groups Queer Endurance In Defiance, the Pōneke Anti-Fascist Coalition and Wellington City Council Māori Ward Councillor Nīkau Wi Neera had called for the conference to be cancelled for allegedly promoting transphobia. In response to the controversy, Ayling said that the Union had sent a letter to the venue remind them that public venues had a responsibility to respect everyone's rights.

=== Candace Owens visa application ===
In December 2024, the FSU organised a petition to the Associate Associate Immigration Minister Chris Penk and submitted a legal challenge against Immigration New Zealand's decision to bar entry to controversial American speaker and political commentator Candace Owens, who had also been barred from entering Australia. After Penk granted Owens a visa to enter New Zealand, Ayling welcomed the Minister's decision, stating "It's up to individuals to decide who they want to listen to, not the Government. The Associate Minister has made the correct decision." In March 2025, The Spinoff current affairs website reported that FSU had lobbied Penks into reversing Immigration NZ's decision to ban Owens from entering New Zealand.

=== Proposed InternetNZ constitution ===
In late February 2025, the NZFSU objected to New Zealand's web domain manager InternetNZ's proposed new constitution. These proposed changes have include enshrining the Treaty of Waitangi, reducing the number of members for its leadership board, ensuring a third of its leadership board's membership would be Māori, and having Māori co-chair. The proposed constitution also requires members to uphold InternetNZ's objects, values, and code of conduct, and ensuring that Internet users could enjoy the Internet safely and free from harm. The constitutional review followed a 2022 review into systemic racism within the organisation. NZFSU member David Harvey and chief executive Jonathan Ayling described the review as "undemocratic, ideological, and censorship-prone." The Post and Radio New Zealand reported that InternetNZ's membership had swelled in late February after the FSU and another advocacy group called Hobson's Pledge encouraged their members to join in order to vote against the proposed constitution. InternetNZ Stephen Judd rejected the FSU's criticism and accused the group of spreading misinformation and confusion.

=== Conflicts with regulatory bodies and the media ===
In late March 2026, The Spinoff reported that the Free Speech Union had opposed efforts by several professional regulatory bodies including the New Zealand Registered Architects Board (NZRAB), the Medical Council of New Zealand, the Nursing Council of New Zealand and the Veterinary Council of New Zealand to incorporate references to indigenous rights, culture and the Treaty of Waitangi to their registration policies, saying they were "policing free speech" by forcing their employees to conform to certain social, cultural or ideological attitudes. In response to lobbying by the FSU, NZRAB chief executive Judith Taylor argued that it was important for registered architects to be aware of cultural competence and safety.

In late July 2026, the Free Speech Union criticised Stuff journalist Andrea Vance for asking Health Minister Simeon Brown about the appointment of Dr Manoja Kalupahana to the Medical Council. Before Brown could respond, the FSU had issued a press release within two hours accusing Vance of pursuing a muckraking campaign. In 2023, the Union had supported Kalupahana after her social media activity had become the subject of a workplace complaint and media scrutiny. On 29 July, a former FSU chairman Robert Mulgan was appointed to the Medical Council. Mulgan had previously lobbied Brown on proposed changes to the regulation of doctors. According The Spinoff, the Free Speech Union had links to Brown's inner circle and included a former FSU chief executive who had worked for Brown. The FSU's chair Stephen Franks denied there was any collusion between the Union and the Health Minister, and denied Vance's report that the Union had lobbied for the appointments of Kaluphana and Mulgan to the Medical Council.

== Works cited ==
- Van Dongen, Yvonne (October 2022). "Voice control". North and South. pp. 24–33. Archived from the original on 27 October 2022.
