= Werry (surname) =

Werry is a surname. Notable people with the surname include:

- Chen Werry (1908–1995), New Zealand businessman and politician
- John Werry, New Zealand psychiatry academic
- Philippa Werry (born 1958), New Zealand writer
- Len Werry (1927–1973), Canadian politician
