= Maren Wellenreuther =

German–New Zealand marine scientist

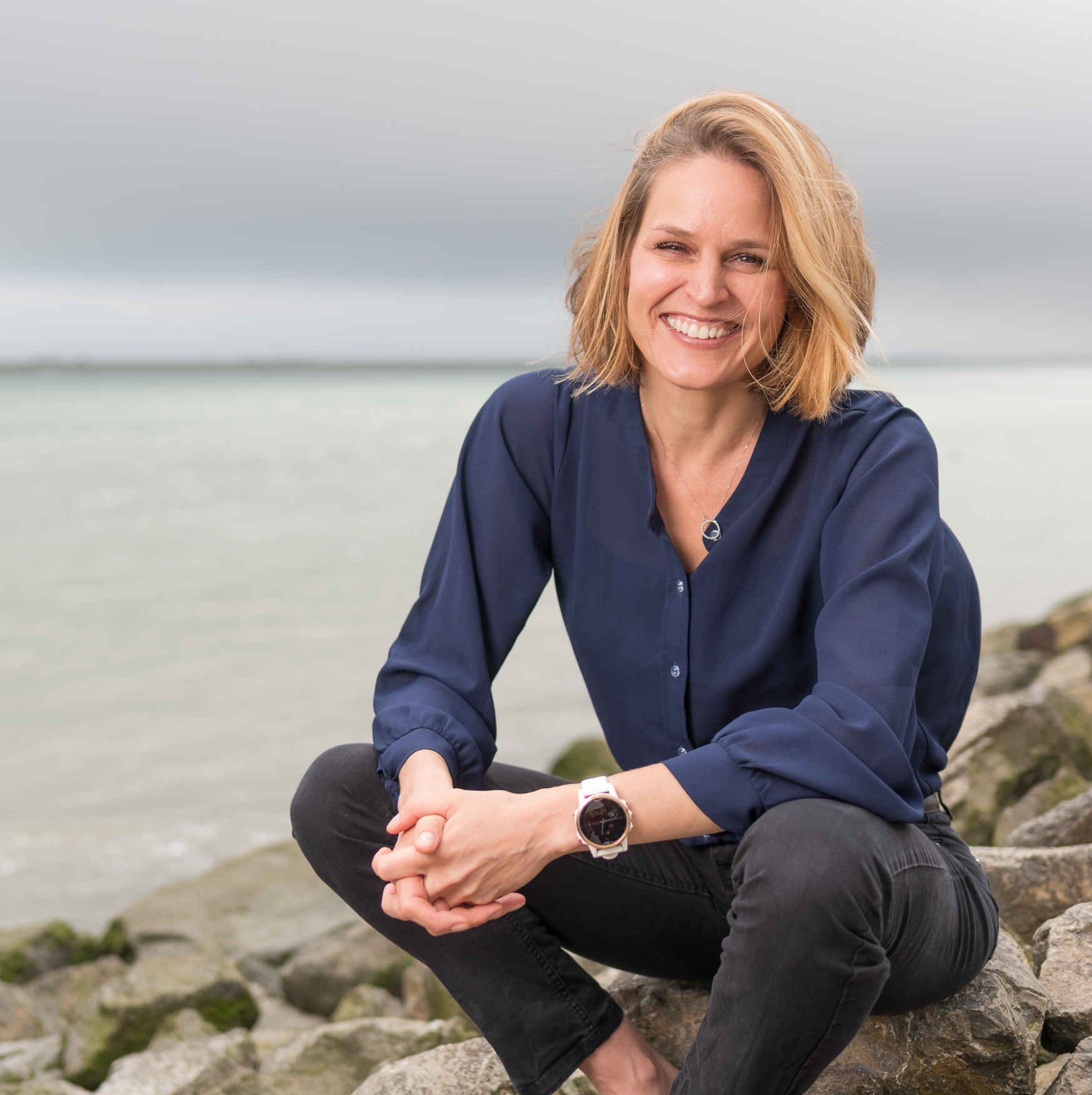
- Awards: Hamilton Award

Academic background
- Education: University of Auckland
- Thesis: Ecological factors associated with speciation in New Zealand triplefin fishes (Family Tripterygiidae) (2007)
- Doctoral advisor: Kendall Clements

Academic work
- Institutions: University of Auckland, Institute for Crop and Food Research, Plant & Food Research, Auckland University of Technology Faculty of Health and Environmental Sciences

Maren Wellenreuther is a German–New Zealand marine scientist, and is a full professor at the University of Auckland, specialising in the development of indigenous fish aquaculture.

== Early life and education ==
Wellenreuther was born in Göttingen. She earned a master's degree in Australia before completing a PhD titled Ecological factors associated with speciation in New Zealand triplefin fishes (Family Tripterygiidae) at the University of Auckland. Her thesis won the Marian Cranwell Prize for best ecological PhD thesis.

== Academic career ==
Wellenreuther undertook her post-doctoral research at Lund University, where she was on the faculty from 2014 to 2017 as an associate professor. Although Wellenreuther is based at Plant & Food Research in Nelson, she has a part-time position on the faculty of the University of Auckland, where she was appointed as full professor in 2024.

Wellenreuther is an evolutionary ecologist and marine scientist, who uses evolutionary theory and genomics to try to improve fish production for aquaculture. Wellenreuther leads an MBIE-funded project worth $5.5 million to develop a native species of fish for aquaculture. The research examines traits such as growth rate and disease resistance in domesticated finfish populations, and focuses on trevally and snapper.

== Honours and awards ==
In 2013 Wellenreuther received a King Carl XVI Gustaf's 50-years award, which was given to "researchers who promote and contribute to the knowledge and preservation of biological diversity". In 2018 she was awarded the Royal Society Te Apārangi's Hamilton Award, an annual award for early career scientists.

== Selected works ==
- Wellenreuther, Maren; Bernatchez, Louis (2018). "Eco-Evolutionary Genomics of Chromosomal Inversions". Trends in Ecology & Evolution. 33 (6): 427–440. doi:10.1016/j.tree.2018.04.002. PMID 29731154. Wikidata Q88582117.
- Bernatchez, Louis; Wellenreuther, Maren; Cristian Araneda; et al. (2017). "Harnessing the Power of Genomics to Secure the Future of Seafood". Trends in Ecology & Evolution. 32 (9): 665–680. doi:10.1016/j.tree.2017.06.010. PMID 28818341. Wikidata Q38619535.
- Claire Mérot; Rebekah A. Oomen; Anna Tigano; Wellenreuther, Maren (2020). "A Roadmap for Understanding the Evolutionary Significance of Structural Genomic Variation". Trends in Ecology & Evolution. 35 (7): 561–572. doi:10.1016/j.tree.2020.03.002. PMID 32521241. Wikidata Q96293618.
- Wellenreuther, Maren; Claire Mérot; Emma L Berdan; Bernatchez, Louis (2019). "Going beyond SNPs: The role of structural genomic variants in adaptive evolution and species diversification". Molecular Ecology. 28 (6): 1203–1209. doi:10.1111/mec.15066. PMID 30834648. Wikidata Q92134113.
- Wellenreuther, Maren; Svensson, Erik; Hansson, Bengt (2014). "Sexual selection and genetic colour polymorphisms in animals". Molecular Ecology. 23 (22): 5398–5414. doi:10.1111/mec.12935. PMID 25251393. Wikidata Q38253873.
- Wellenreuther, Maren; Hansson, Bengt (2016). "Detecting Polygenic Evolution: Problems, Pitfalls, and Promises". Trends in Genetics. 32 (3): 155–164. doi:10.1016/j.tig.2015.12.004. PMID 26806794. Wikidata Q38710359.
- Bybee, Seth; Alex Córdoba-Aguilar; M Catherine Duryea; et al. (2016). "Odonata (dragonflies and damselflies) as a bridge between ecology and evolutionary genomics". Frontiers in Zoology. 13 (1): 46. doi:10.1186/s12983-016-0176-7. PMC 5057408. PMID 27766110. Wikidata Q28069974.
