= Royal Society of New Zealand =

Academy of sciences, New Zealand

- Royal Society of New Zealand Te Apārangi

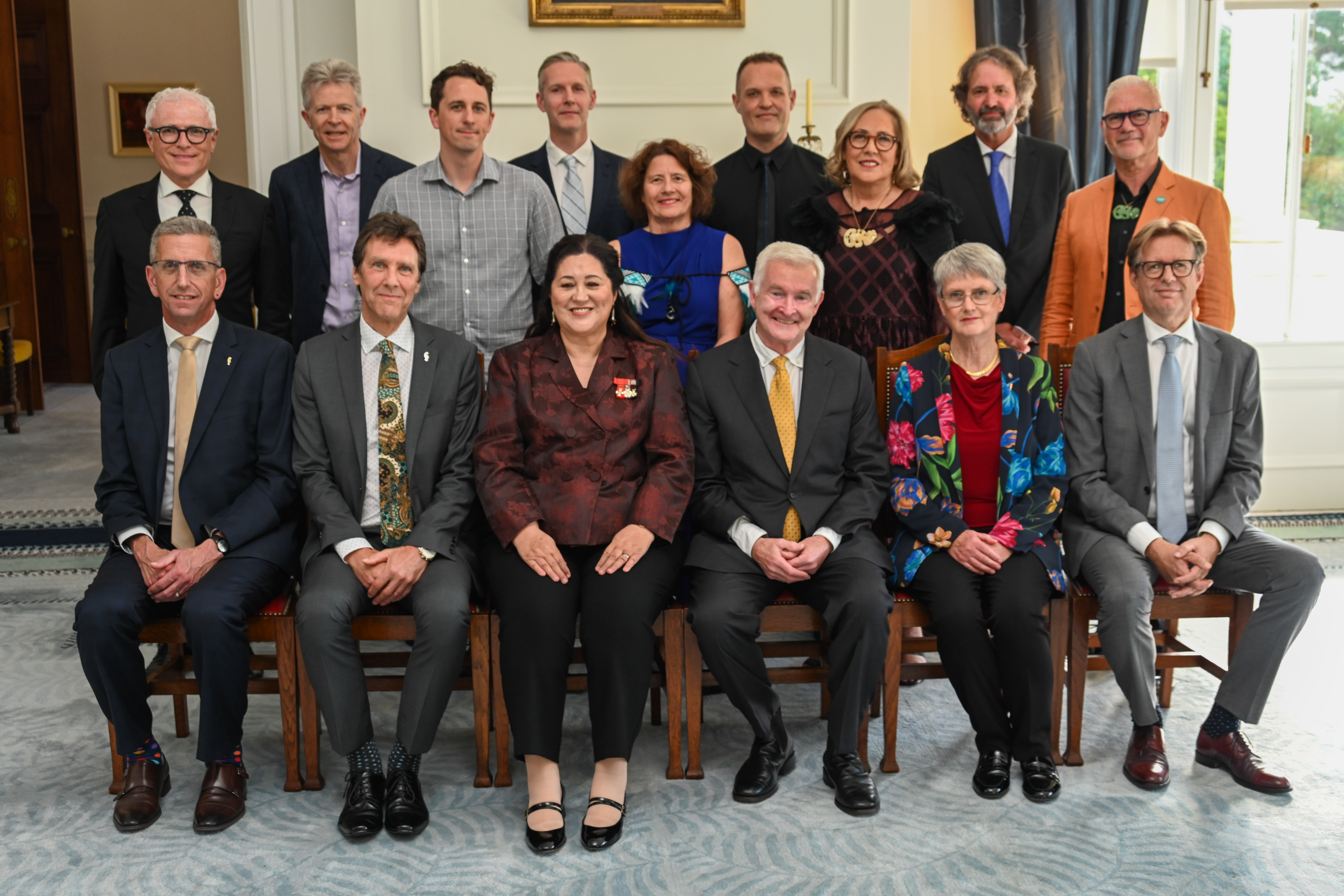
- 2023 Royal Society Te Apārangi research honour recipients with the governor-general and her husband
- Abbreviation: Royal Society Te Apārangi
- Formation: 1867; 159 years ago
- Type: Independent statutory organisation
- Headquarters: 11 Turnbull Street, Thorndon, Wellington 6011, New Zealand
- Coordinates: 41°16′26″S 174°46′45″E
- Members: More than 400 Fellows
- President: Jane Harding
- Website: royalsociety.org.nz

The Royal Society of New Zealand, branded as the Royal Society Te Apārangi, is a not-for-profit body in New Zealand providing funding and policy advice in the fields of sciences and the humanities. These fundings (i.e., Marsden grants and research fellowships) are provided on behalf of the New Zealand Ministry of Business, Innovation and Employment.

== History ==
The Royal Society of New Zealand was founded in 1867 as the New Zealand Institute, a successor to the New Zealand Society, which had been founded by Sir George Grey in 1851. The institute, established by the New Zealand Institute Act 1867, was an apex organisation in science, with the Auckland Institute, the Wellington Philosophical Society, the Philosophical Institute of Canterbury, and the Westland Naturalists' and Acclimatization Society as constituents. It later included the Otago Institute and other similar organisations. The Colonial Museum (later to become Te Papa), which had been established two years earlier, in 1865, was granted to the New Zealand Institute.

Publishing transactions and proceedings was one of the institute's initial functions. It was granted a budget of 500 pounds, established through the Act, which was almost exclusively spent on the production and free distribution to members of incorporated societies.

James Hector was the manager of the institute and Director of the Colonial Museum and Geological Survey from 1867 until his retirement in 1903.

In 1933, the Institute's name was changed to Royal Society of New Zealand, in reference to the Royal Society of London, a move requiring royal assent and a subsequent Act of Parliament. In 2010, the organisation's remit was expanded to include the social sciences and the humanities.

In 2007, "Te Apārangi" (Māori for 'group of experts') was added to its name. In 2017, its sesquicentenary, it started using the shortened full name Royal Society Te Apārangi. Its legal name, as defined in legislation, remains Royal Society of New Zealand.

== Goals ==
Constituted under the Royal Society of New Zealand Act 1997 (amended in 2012), the society exists to:

1. Foster in the New Zealand community a culture that supports science and technology, including (without limitation):
  1. The promotion of public awareness, knowledge, and understanding of science and technology; and
  2. The advancement of science and technology education,
2. Encourage, promote, and recognise excellence in science and technology,
3. Provide an infrastructure and other support for the professional needs and development of scientists and technologists,
4. Provide expert advice on important public issues to the Government and the community,
5. Do all other lawful things which the Council considers conducive to the advancement and promotion of science and technology in New Zealand.

It is a federation of 49 scientific and technological organisations and several affiliate organisations, and also has individual members.

== Activities ==
The Society's activities include:

- Science funding – as a non-political funding distribution agency for government funding, particularly in science research and science education. The Society administers the contestable Marsden fund for 'blue skies' research. Since 2010 the Society has run the annual Rutherford Discovery Fellowships, supporting ten early to mid-career researchers for a five year term. In 2021 a one-off round of thirty post-doctoral fellowships, the MBIE Science Whitinga Fellowships, was announced, to be administered by the Society. From 1996 to 2023, the Society administered the James Cook Research Fellowship. After 2023, both the Rutherford Discovery Fellowships and the James Cook Research Fellowships were replaced by the MBIE-administered New Zealand Mana Tūārangi Distinguished Researcher Fellowships.
- Publishing – peer-reviewed journals such as the New Zealand Journal of Botany and the New Zealand Journal of Zoology.
- Meetings and seminars – most local branches and constituent scientific and technological organisations run seminar series of some description; the Society promotes these and coordinates touring international lecturers.
- Awards and medals – including:
  - Rutherford Medal (formerly the Gold Medal) – awarded annually for exceptional contributions to the advancement and promotion of public awareness, knowledge and understanding in addition to eminent research or technological practice by a person or group in any field of science, mathematics, social science, or technology
  - Fleming Award – awarded triennially to recognise protection of New Zealand's environment
  - Hector Medal – awarded annually for outstanding work in chemical, physical or mathematical and information sciences by a researcher in New Zealand
  - Hutton Medal – Earth, plant and animal sciences award for outstanding work by a researcher in New Zealand, awarded annually.
  - Pickering Medal – awarded annually to recognise people who have made outstanding contributions to New Zealand society and culture in science, mathematics, social science, and technology.
  - Te Rangi Hiroa Medal – awarded for work in social sciences.
  - Humanities Aronui Medal – awarded annually for "research or innovative work of outstanding merit in the Humanities".
- Science education – promotes quality science education and plays a role in setting the national science curriculum.

The Society administers the Prime Minister's Science Prizes.

As part of its 150th anniversary celebrations, the Society published a series of 150 biographies of women who had contributed to knowledge in New Zealand, called "150 women in 150 words".

== Statement on climate change ==
On 10 July 2008, the Society released a statement on climate change that said, in summary:

The globe is warming because of increasing greenhouse gas emissions. Measurements show that greenhouse gas concentrations in the atmosphere are well above levels seen for many thousands of years. Further global climate changes are predicted, with impacts expected to become more costly as time progresses. Reducing future impacts of climate change will require substantial reductions of greenhouse gas emissions.

== Listener letter on science ==
In 2021, a report by a working group appointed by the New Zealand Government proposed giving indigenous knowledge, or mātauranga Māori, parity with Western science in the secondary-school curriculum. In response, seven University of Auckland academics —Kendall Clements, Garth Cooper, Michael Corballis, Doug Elliffe, Robert Nola, Elizabeth Rata and John Werry — published a letter, "In Defence of Science", in the 31 July issue of New Zealand Listener. They acknowledged mātauranga Māori's cultural value but argued it "falls far short of what can be defined as science itself" and warned that treating the two as epistemologically equivalent would be patronising.

=== Immediate reactions ===
Vice-chancellor Dawn Freshwater told staff the letter had "caused considerable hurt and dismay" and did not represent the university's view. The Tertiary Education Union called the wording "offensive, racist [and] neo-colonial", arguing it ignored Māori scholars who already combine science and mātauranga Māori. A counter-letter organised by Shaun Hendy and Siouxsie Wiles labelled the original text "scientific racism"; within forty-eight hours more than 2,000 people had signed it online. Māori academics such as Daniel Hikuroa, Tara McAllister and Ocean Mercier argued that elements of mātauranga Māori—like the maramataka lunar calendar—are demonstrably empirical and that science itself has often aided colonisation. By contrast, supporters including MP Paul Goldsmith (politician) and biologists Richard Dawkins and Jerry Coyne defended the seven authors and compared the proposed curriculum change to teaching creationism in science classes.

=== Royal Society investigation ===
On 17 November 2021 the New Zealand Free Speech Union revealed that the Royal Society had opened a formal investigation into Fellows Garth Cooper and Robert Nola over alleged breaches of its Code of Conduct. Seventy Fellows later sent a motion of no confidence, accusing the Society of "shutting down useful debate and bringing international opprobrium". On 11 March 2022 the Society's Initial Investigation Panel dismissed the complaints, stating that they relied on "contentious expert opinion" unsuitable for disciplinary adjudication.

=== Academic freedom, tikanga Māori and censorship claims ===
Free Speech Union spokesperson Jonathan Ayling argued the investigation created a "chilling effect" on dissent and showed the Society had "abandoned its own heritage of academic freedom". Literature professor Brian Boyd and chemist Peter Schwerdtfeger likewise criticised what they called an ill-considered attempt to police legitimate scholarly debate. Others maintain that free speech, academic freedom and tikanga Māori are not inherently at odds. Legal scholar Carwyn Jones contends that wānanga—structured deliberation guided by tikanga—"protects and supports the free exchange of ideas", demonstrating that Māori frameworks already embed rigorous debate. Conversely, critics such as Tina Ngata argue that invoking "free speech" here masks structural power imbalances and perpetuates the marginalisation of Māori perspectives.

=== Subsequent developments ===
Debate over how to teach indigenous knowledge resurfaced in 2024 when Science published a series of commentaries. Some authors urged educators to "teach Indigenous knowledge alongside science", while others said moves toward epistemic "equal status" risked importing vitalism and other non-empirical beliefs into classrooms. After eighteen months of controversy, exam objectives referring to the Māori concept of mauri were withdrawn from the national chemistry standards, though related teaching materials remain.

== Presidents ==
The list below shows all presidents of the Royal Society of New Zealand, known as the New Zealand Institute from 1867 to 1933, and since 2017 as the Royal Society Te Apārangi.

Presidents of the Royal Society of New Zealand
Name	Dates	Field of expertise
Frederick Hutton	1904–05	
James Hector	1906–1907	
G. M. Thomson	1907–1909	
Augustus Hamilton	1909–1911	
Thomas Cheeseman	1911–1913	
Charles Chilton	1913–1915	
Donald Petrie	1915–1916	
William Benham	1916–1918	zoology
Leonard Cockayne	1918–1920	
Thomas Easterfield	1920–1922	
Harry Kirk	1922–1924	biology
Patrick Marshall	1924–1926	
Bernard Aston	1926–1928	
Allan Thomson	1928	geology
Bernard Aston	1928–1929	
Coleridge Farr	1929–1931	
Hugh Segar	1931–1933	
Robert Speight	1933–1935	
William Williams	1935–1937	
William Percival Evans	1937–1939	
John Holloway	1939–1941	botany
Gilbert Archey	1941–1943	
Harry Allan	1943–1945	
Noel Benson	1945–1947	
Ernest Marsden	1947	
Robert Falla	1947–1950	
Frank Callaghan	1950–1952	
Walter Oliver	1952–1954	
David Miller	1954–1956	entomology
Bob Briggs	1956–1958	chemistry
Robin Allan	1958–1960	
Joseph Dixon	1960–1962	
Charles Fleming	1962–1964	ornithology
Miles Barnett	1964	
Charles Fleming	1964–1966	ornithology
John Miles	1966–1970	microbiology
Dick Willett	1970–1974	
Malcolm Burns	1974–1977	
Richard Dell	1977–1981	
Ted Bollard	1981–1985	
Trevor Hatherton	1985–1989	
Jack Dodd	1989–1993	
Philippa Black	1993–1997	
John Scott	1997–2000	
Gil Simpson	2000–2003	
Jim Watson	2004–2006	biology
Neville Jordan	2006–2009	
Garth Carnaby	2009–2012	
David Skegg	2012–2015	
Richard Bedford	2015–2018	human geography
Wendy Larner	2018–2021	
Brent Clothier	2021–2024	
Jane Harding	2024–present	

== Fellows ==
The Academy Executive Committee of the Society from time to time elects as a Fellow of the Royal Society of New Zealand any person who in its opinion "has achieved distinction in research or the advancement of science, technology or the humanities." The number of Fellows is limited to such number as is agreed from time to time between the Academy Executive Committee and the Council of the Society. A Fellow is entitled to use, in connection with his or her name, either the letters FRSNZ, which stand for Fellow of the Royal Society of New Zealand, or such other letters or title as is agreed from time to time between the Academy Executive Committee and the Council. The first female Fellow, Kathleen Curtis, was elected in 1936.

== Chief executive ==
Di McCarthy served as Chief Executive from 2007 to 2014. Andrew Cleland led the Society from 2014 until his retirement in 2021.

Cindy Kiro was appointed Ahorangi Chief Executive in October 2020, commencing on 1 March 2021; she left later that year on being appointed Governor-General of New Zealand, sworn in on 21 October 2021.

In July 2021 the Society announced that Paul Atkins would become Chief Executive; he took up the role on 29 November 2021. In September 2025 the Society announced that Justine Daw had been appointed as the next Tumu Whakarae | Chief Executive, to take up the position on 5 January 2026.

== Constituent organisations ==
The Society has both individual and organisational members. Constituent organisations help the Society identify and address issues relevant to the research, knowledge and innovation sectors, and link into the research information and activities that the Society undertakes. These constituent organisations are:

- Association for Women in the Sciences
- Association of Social Anthropologists of Aotearoa/New Zealand
- Australasian Association of Philosophy
- Australian and New Zealand Optical Society
- Australian and New Zealand Society for Immunology (NZ branch)
- Australasian Society of Clinical and Experimental Pharmacologists and Toxicologists (NZ Section)(ASCEPT)
- Geoscience Society of New Zealand (formerly Geological Society of New Zealand)
- Meteorological Society of New Zealand
- New Zealand Archaeological Association
- New Zealand Association of Scientists
- New Zealand Ecological Society
- New Zealand Freshwater Sciences Society
- New Zealand Geographical Society
- New Zealand Geothermal Association
- New Zealand Historical Association
- New Zealand Hydrological Society
- New Zealand Institute of Agricultural & Horticultural Science
- New Zealand Institute of Chemistry
- New Zealand Institute of Economic Research
- New Zealand Institute of Food Science and Technology
- New Zealand Institute of Physics
- New Zealand Marine Sciences Society
- New Zealand Mathematical Society
- New Zealand Microbiological Society
- New Zealand Plant Protection Society
- New Zealand Political Studies Association/Te Kahui Tatai Torangapu o Aotearoa
- New Zealand Psychological Society
- New Zealand Society for Biochemistry and Molecular Biology
- New Zealand Society for Parasitology
- New Zealand Society of Endocrinology
- New Zealand Society of Plant Biologists (NZSPB)
- New Zealand Society of Soil Science
- New Zealand Statistical Association
- Nutrition Society of New Zealand
- Philosophy of Education Society of Australasia
- Physiological Society of New Zealand
- Population Association of New Zealand
- Royal Astronomical Society of New Zealand
- Sociological Association of Aotearoa NZ SAANZ
- The Ornithological Society of New Zealand Inc. Te Kāhui Mātai Manu o Aotearoa

=== Regional constituent organisations ===
Regional constituent organisations (branches) are geographical constituents and include:

- Auckland Museum Institute (formerly known as Auckland Institute and Auckland Institute and Museum), the membership body of Auckland War Memorial Museum
- Hawkes Bay Branch of the Royal Society of New Zealand
- Nelson Science Society
- Otago Institute for the Arts and Sciences
- Royal Society of New Zealand Canterbury Branch
- Royal Society of New Zealand Manawatu Branch Incorporated (formerly the 'Manawatu Philosophical Society')
- Royal Society of New Zealand Rotorua Branch
- Royal Society of New Zealand Wellington Branch (formerly the 'Wellington Philosophical Society')
- The Waikato Branch of the Royal Society of New Zealand
- Wanaka Branch of the Royal Society of New Zealand

== Affiliate organisations ==
The Society includes affiliate organisations that cover a diversity of disciplines, including policy, science education and the museum sector:

- Wellington Astronomical Society Inc
- Otago Museum
- Environmental Protection Authority
- House of Science (HoS NZ Charitable Trust)
- International Institute of Refrigeration (NZ National Cttee)
- Medical Research Institute of New Zealand
- Motu Economic and Public Policy Research
- National Science-Technology Roadshow Trust
- New Zealand Association of Economists
- New Zealand Association Impact Assessment
- Statistics Research Associates Ltd
- Te Manawa: Science Centre/Manawatu Museum
- Water New Zealand
