= Listener letter on science =

New Zealand science debate on Māori scientific knowledge

On July 24, 2021, in the context of a review of the secondary school curriculum National Certificate of Educational Achievement (NCEA), seven University of Auckland professors and emeriti professors (known informally as the Listener Seven) published a letter titled "In Defence of Science" in the current affairs magazine New Zealand Listener, which generated considerable controversy for claiming indigenous knowledge (or mātauranga Māori) "falls far short of what can be defined as science itself."

== Background ==
In February 2020, the New Zealand Cabinet proposed several changes to the country's secondary school curriculum National Certificate of Educational Achievement (NCEA) including according equal status to mātauranga Māori (indigenous knowledge). Key changes have included developing new ways to recognise mātauranga Māori, building teacher capability, and improving resourcing and support for Māori learners and Māori worldview pathways.

In response to a 2021 report from a Government NCEA working group which proposed changes to the Māori school curriculum to ensure mātauranga Māori's parity with Western epistemologies, seven University of Auckland senior academics Kendall Clements, Garth Cooper, Michael Corballis, Doug Elliffe, Robert Nola, Elizabeth Rata, and John Werry penned a letter that was published in the 31 July issue of the New Zealand Listener expressing disagreement with two of the report's assertions:

- That science has been used to support the domination of Eurocentric views including colonialism and the suppression of Māori knowledge. (That said, the letter does explicitly state that science "has been used to aid colonisation, as have literature and art".)
- The notion that science is a Western European invention and itself evidence of domination over Māori and other indigenous peoples.

The authors argued that science was universal to humanity with origins in ancient Egypt, Mesopotamia, ancient Greece, and India. They also noted the Muslim world's significant contributions to mathematics, astronomy, and physics; which later passed onto Europe and North America. The authors also asserted that science was neutral rather than a tool of colonialism, highlighting its contributions to tackling global issues such as the COVID-19 pandemic, climate change, pollution, biodiversity loss, and environmental degradation.

While recognising the contributions of indigenous knowledge to culture, public policy and scientific knowledge, the authors contended that it was not science since it did not meet what they regarded as the scientific criteria for "empirical, universal truths." They alleged that placing indigenous knowledge on the same level as science would patronise and fail indigenous populations. Instead, they proposed ensuring that everyone had the opportunity to participate in the world's scientific enterprises.

== Investigation ==
In mid-November 2021, the Royal Society Te Apārangi launched an investigation into two of the Listener letter's co-authors: biological scientist Garth Cooper and philosophy professor Robert Nola, who were fellows of the Royal Society. A third co-author and society fellow, psychology professor Michael Corballis, had died earlier in the month. According to Nola, the Royal Society had established a three-person panel to investigate five anonymous complaints leveled against him and Cooper. Nola and Cooper had successfully challenged the appointment of two of the panellists, who had signed the open counter letter to the Listener letter (see § Criticism). In addition, three of the five complainants withdrew their complaints after the Royal Society required that they be identified for the disciplinary process to proceed.

The Royal Society's investigation of Cooper and Nola was criticised by several Royal Society fellows, who threatened to resign if they were disciplined. University of Auckland literature professor Brian Boyd criticised what he described as the "knee jerk" reaction to the Listener letter and described the view that mātauranga Māori be protected and only transmitted by Māori as contrary to the principles of universities and the Royal Society. Massey University chemistry professor Peter Schwerdtfeger criticised the Royal Society's investigation as shameful and urged them to be open to debate and discussion. Free Speech Union spokesperson Jonathan Ayling argued that the pursuit of science depends on free speech and accused the Royal Society of "abandoning its own heritage and tradition of academic freedom." At the end of March 2022, 70 Royal Society fellows signed a motion of no confidence in the Society over its treatment of the signatories of the letter.

On 11 March 2022, the Royal Society published the decision of its Initial Investigation Panel, which concluded that the "complaints should not proceed to a Complaints Determination Committee" on the basis of clause 6.4(i) of the Complaints Procedures: "the complaint is not amenable to resolution by a Complaint Determination Committee, including by reason of its demanding the open-ended evaluation of contentious expert opinion or of contested scientific evidence amongst researchers and scholars".

== Responses ==
=== Criticism ===
University of Auckland vice-chancellor Dawn Freshwater said the letter "caused considerable hurt and dismay among our staff, students and alumni" and that "the institution had respect for mātauranga Māori as a valuable knowledge system, and that it was not at odds with Western empirical science and did not need to compete." The Tertiary Education Union (TEU), the union which represents academics such as the professors, released a statement saying they "neglected to engage with or mention the many highly accomplished scholars and scientists in Aotearoa who have sought to reconcile notions of science, mātauranga Māori, and Māori in science." The Royal Society Te Apārangi released a statement saying "The Society strongly upholds the value of mātauranga Māori and rejects the narrow and outmoded definition of science outlined in [the letter]." The New Zealand Association of Scientists released a statement saying "we were dismayed to see a number of prominent academics publicly questioning the value of mātauranga to science."

Daniel Hikuroa, also an academic and associate Professor in Maori Studies at the University of Auckland, asserted that some (though not all) mātauranga Māori, like the predictive aspects of Maramataka (the Māori lunar calendar), "was clearly science." University of Canterbury academic Tara McAllister said "we [Māori] did not navigate to Aotearoa on myths and legends. We did not live successfully in balance with the environment without science. Māori were the first scientists in Aotearoa." Researcher and scholar Tina Ngata claimed that "this letter, in all of its unsolicited glory, is a true testament to how racism is harboured and fostered within New Zealand academia."

In late July 2021, University of Auckland epidemiologists Professor Shaun Hendy and Associate-Professor Siouxsie Wiles penned an open counter-letter expressing disagreement with the views expressed by the "Listener Seven". They argued that indigenous knowledge was compatible with Western understandings of the scientific method. They claimed that mātauranga Māori was unique and complemented Western knowledge systems. Their letter also asserted that the diminishing role of indigenous knowledge in science was "simply another tool for exclusion and exploitation". They also claimed that science's "ongoing role in perpetuating scientific racism, justifying colonisation, and continuing support of systems that create injustice" was fueling mistrust in science.

=== Support ===
The letter writers were supported by National Party Member of Parliament Paul Goldsmith, who stated that "we should learn about Māori understandings of the world, but not at the expense of our expertise in what the rest of the world call science." In addition, American biologist Jerry Coyne, British biologist Richard Dawkins, and University of Auckland literary academic Brian Boyd likened moves to elevate Māori indigenous knowledge to the same level as science as the equivalent of teaching creationism and Intelligent Design in the school curriculum. Coyne and Dawkins also objected to the Royal Society of New Zealand's investigation of Cooper and Nola. Similar sentiments were echoed by conservative British social commentator and associate editor of The Spectator Toby Young, who defended Cooper and likened the Royal Society's investigation to a witch hunt.

In mid-November 2021, the Free Speech Union objected to the Royal Society's investigation as an attack on academic freedom and organised a fundraiser to support Cooper and Nola.

In late December 2021, seven academics (Victoria University of Wellington Associate Dean Michael Johnston, Victoria University of Wellington Senior Lecturer James Kierstead, Dr David Lillis, Massey University chemistry professor Peter Schwerdtfeger, Auckland University of Technology environmental science professor Lindsey White, and University of Auckland professor Brian Boyd) published a joint letter in the website Newsroom defending the co-authors of the Listener letter from accusations of racism and urging universities and the Royal Society to uphold academic freedom and scientific inquiry.

=== 2022 symposium ===
In mid December 2021, University of Auckland Vice-Chancellor Freshwater announced that a symposium would be held in early 2022 to discuss and debate the relationship between matauranga Māori and science. The symposium would host representatives from various viewpoints including mātauranga Māori, science, the humanities, and Pacific knowledge systems. Freshwater stated that the University of Auckland had also been undergoing a programme to "review and refresh" its commitment to academic freedom and freedom of expression. This programme is headed by Professor Peter Hunter, who confirmed that the University had a mechanism to debate controversial issues via its "Hot Topics" forum.

According to Stuff, in March 2022 a spokesman for the university confirmed that the symposium had been delayed. Instead of the promised symposium and an open debate platform, the University's Faculty of Science invited staff to participate in the Mātauranga Engagement Programme, contrary to the expectation of an open dialogue. The Free Speech Union noted that "the explicit statement that it was not to be a space for debating or invalidating its role in science is contradictory."

=== Subsequent developments ===
Inclusion of mātauranga Māori and other systems of indigenous knowledge in education was the subject of several 2024 articles in the journal Science. Proponents argued that indigenous knowledge can be complementary to science and includes empirical information, even encoded in myths, and that it holds equal educational value to science like the arts and humanities. They argued it should be taught alongside science, but not within the science curriculum itself. Efforts to include it in education were criticised on the grounds that it is inseparable from spiritual and religious beliefs, leading to their introduction into science classes; that it is not possible to reconcile contradictions between the two; that it comes at the cost of delivering curricula that meets international standards; that policies granting science and indigenous knowledge equal status are based on relativism and inhibit science from questioning claims made by indigenous knowledge systems; and that many proponents of indigenous knowledge engage in ideological antiscience rhetoric. The vitalist Māori concept of mauri was inserted into the New Zealand national chemistry curriculum, and the government ignored the objections of science teachers citing the 'equal status' (mana ōrite) policy. It was later removed from exam objectives after 18 months of controversy, though it still appeared in some materials afterwards.

== See also ==
- Indigenous science
