= Wellenreuther =

Wellenreuther is a surname. Notable people with the surname include:

- Claus Wellenreuther (1935–2026), German entrepreneur, co-founder of SAP AG
- Ingo Wellenreuther (born 1959), German politician (CDU)
- Maren Wellenreuther, German marine scientist in New Zealand
- Timon Wellenreuther (born 1995), German association footballer
