= Robert Nola =

New Zealand academic (1940–2022)

- Born: 25 June 1940
- Died: 23 October 2022 (aged 82); Auckland, New Zealand
- Education: University of Auckland; Australian National University
- Spouse: Jan Crosthwaite
- Scientific career
- Fields: Philosophy of science
- Workplaces: University of Auckland
- Thesis: Theoretical change in the physical sciences: a study of theory reduction and theory replacement in science (1968)

Robert Nola (25 June 1940 – 23 October 2022) was a New Zealand philosophy academic, and was an Emeritus Professor in the Department of Philosophy at the University of Auckland. His work focussed on the philosophy and history of science, on epistemology and on metaphysics.

== Early life ==
Nola's mother was New Zealand-born and his father was an immigrant from Dalmatia in Croatia. His family were nominally Catholic, his mother becoming a Catholic to marry his father. Nola attended a state school, rather than a Catholic school. He studied mathematics and philosophy at the University of Auckland.

== Academic career ==
After a 1968 PhD titled Theoretical change in the physical sciences: a study of theory reduction and theory replacement in science at the Australian National University, Nola moved to the University of Auckland, rising to full professor.

Nola was elected a Fellow of the Royal Society of New Zealand in 2009 and was a Fellow of the New Zealand Academy of the Humanities.

In July 2021, in the context of a review of the NCEA (New Zealand's National Curriculum), Nola, along with six other University of Auckland Professors and Emeritus Professors published a controversial letter "In Defence of Science" in the New Zealand Listener. Along with Professor Garth Cooper, Nola resigned from the Royal Society Te Āparangi in March 2022 regarding the controversy.

== Selected works ==
- Nola, Robert (1988). Relativism and Realism in Science. Springer.
- Nola, Robert (1998). Foucault. F. Cass.
- Nola, Robert, and Howard Sankey (2000). After Popper, Kuhn, and Feyerabend: Recent Issues in Theories of Scientific Method. Springer.
- Nola, Robert (2003). Rescuing Reason: A Critique of Anti-rationalist Views of Science and Knowledge. Kluwer.
- Nola, Robert, and Gürol Irzık (2006). Philosophy, Science, Education and Culture. Vol. 28. Springer Science & Business Media.
- David Braddon-Mitchell, Robert Nola (2008). "Introducing the Canberra Plan". In Conceptual Analysis and Philosophical Naturalism. MIT Press.
- Irzik, Gürol, and Robert Nola (2011). "A family resemblance approach to the nature of science for science education". Science & Education 20, no. 7: 591-607.
- Nola, Robert, and Howard Sankey (2014). Theories of Scientific Method: An Introduction. Routledge.
- Irzik, Gürol, and Robert Nola (2014). "New directions for nature of science research". In International Handbook of Research in History, Philosophy and Science Teaching, pp. 999–1021. Dordrecht: Springer.
- Nola, R. (2018). Demystifying Religious Belief. In H. van Eyghen, R. Peels, G. van den Brink (Eds.) New Developments in the Cognitive Science of Religion: The Rationality of Religious Belief (pp. 71-92). Heidelberg: Springer.
- Nola, R. (2019). Definition: Atheism. In J. Koterski, G. Oppy (Eds.) Theism and Atheism: Opposing Arguments in Philosophy (pp. 19-34). Farmington Hills, MI: Macmillan Reference USA.
