= Louis Bernatchez =

Canadian professor

- Born: 1960
- Died: 28 September 2023 (aged 63)
- Citizenship: Canadian
- Education: Laval University
- Scientific career
- Fields: Molecular ecology; Conservation biology
- Workplaces: Laval University
- Thesis: La variabilité de l'ADN mitochondrial en rapport avec la biogéographie et l'histoire pléistocène des corégonidés (1990)
- Doctoral advisor: Julian Dodson
- Website: https://www.bio.ulaval.ca/louisbernatchez/presentation.htm

Louis Bernatchez CQ MSRC (1960 – September 28, 2023) was a Canadian professor of genetics at Laval University and a Canada Research Chair in genomics and conservation of aquatic resources. Louis Bernatchez was a co-founder of the Canadian Society for Ecology and Evolution.

Bernatchez authored over 500 scientific publications and mentored dozens of students in applying genomics and evolution to the multiple fields, including wildlife management, medicine, agriculture, aquaculture, forestry, conservation, environmental sciences, microbiology and toxicology.

== Select awards and honours ==
- 2001 – Michel-Jurdant Prize, ACFAS
- 2011 – Fellow, American Association for the Advancement of Science
- 2011 – Fellow, Royal Society of Canada
- 2012 – Prix Marie-Victorin, Government of Quebec
- 2020 – Knight, National Order of Quebec
