= Gürol Irzık =

Turkish philosopher

- Born: 3 June 1955 (age 71); Denizli

Education
- Education: Robert College; Boğaziçi University; Indiana University
- Thesis: Causal modeling in the social sciences : foundations and applications to philosophy

Philosophical work
- Era: Contemporary philosophy
- Region: Western philosophy
- School: Analytic philosophy
- Language: Turkish, English
- Main interests: Philosophy of Science; Epistemic Injustice; Political Philosophy; Science Education

Gürol Irzık (born June 3, 1955 in Denizli) is a Turkish philosopher and professor.

== Life ==
He was born in Denizli in 1955. He graduated from Robert College in 1973 and from Boğaziçi University Electrical Engineering Department in 1977. He received a master's degree in mathematics from the same university in 1979 and a doctorate in philosophy of social sciences from Indiana University, Bloomington in 1986. Irzık has been working at Sabancı University since 2009 and has also served as a guest lecturer at Istanbul Technical University, Polish Academy of Sciences, Auckland University, Duke University and Vassar College.

Irzık is a former member of the European Cultural Parliament and the Turkish Academy of Sciences and a current member of The Science Academy Society of Turkey.

Thomas Kuhn, one of the most important philosophers of science of the 20th century, stated that he probably never would have written The Structure of Scientific Revolutions if he had read the article Irzık co-authored with Teo Grünberg titled "Carnap and Kuhn: Arch Enemies or Close Allies?" and sent letters of praise to both authors.

== Selected publications ==
=== Books ===
- Science, Philosophy, Education and Culture, 2005 (with R. Nola)
- Human Rights Issues in Textbooks: The Turkish Case, History Foundation of Turkey Publications, 2004 (with D. T. Ceylan)
- How are We Educated?, History Foundation of Turkey Publications, 2005 (with D. T. Ceylan)
- Logic and Philosophy of the Sciences, The Proc. of the 21st World Congress of Philosophy, 2007 (with S. Voss et al.)

=== Selected Articles ===
- G. Irzık and R. Nola (2011) "A with family resemh to the nature of science for science education", Science and Education (Sp. Iss. SI), Vol.20, No.7-8, 591-607 (SSCI).
- G. Irzık and R. Nola (2022) "Revisiting the foundations of the family resemblance approach to nature of science: some new ideas".
- G. Irzık and T. Grünberg (1995) "Carnap and Kuhn: Arch Enemies or Close Allies?", The British Journal for the Philosophy of Science, vol. 46,1995: 285-307.
- G. Irzık and F. Kurtulmuş (2019) "What is epistemic public trust in science?", British Journal for the Philosophy of Science, Vol.70, No.4, 1145-1166 (SCI, SSCI, AHCI).
- F. Kurtulmuş and G. Irzık (2017) "Justice in the distribution of knowledge", Episteme, Vol.14, No.2, 129-146 (AHCI). rol (2017) "Justice in the distribution of knowledge", Episteme, Vol.14, No.2, 129-146 (AHCI).
- Irzık, Gürol and Nola, Robert (2022) "Revisiting the foundations of the family resemblance approach to nature of science: some new ideas".
