= Māori and conservation =

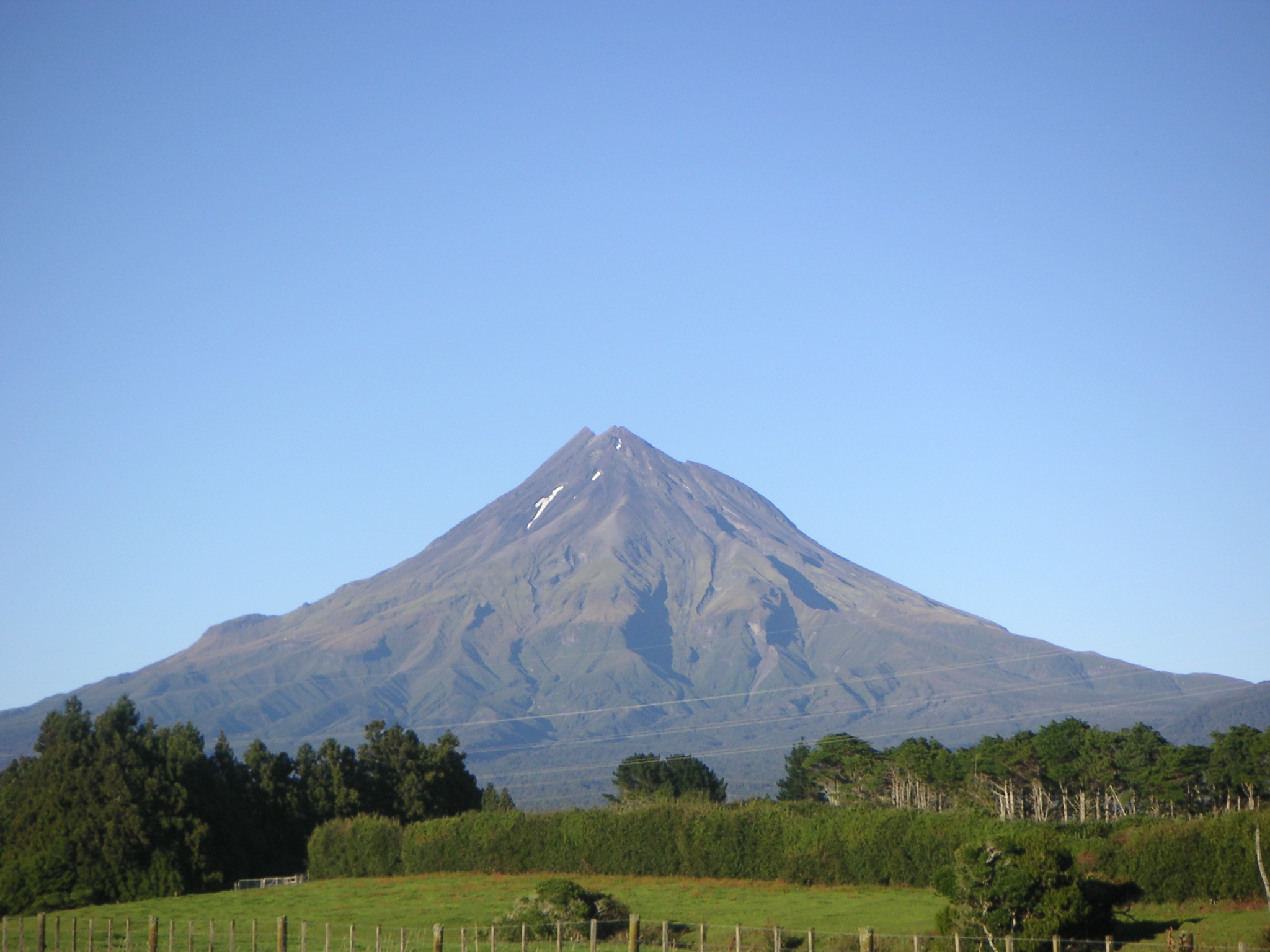
Mt. Taranaki was given the status of a legal person in 2025.

The Māori people have had a strong and changing conservation ethic since their discovery and settlement of New Zealand. This is closely tied to their spiritual beliefs.

== Māori settlement ==
The biodiversity of New Zealand was much greater when Polynesians settled the country around 1250–1300 than it is now. There were marine mammals and bats, and a large and diverse bird population inhabited the forests. The Māori people had an adverse impact on the ecosystem. They introduced the Polynesian rat, which was devastating for the insect, lizard and bird populations, including the avian species that had evolved with no behavioural defence, as they had few natural predators. Māori burned large swathes of forests, so that they could hunt birds such as the flightless moa more easily, and to grow kūmara and fern-root. Within 200 years, up to 40% of the native forests of New Zealand were burnt and destroyed, moa and other large birds had been hunted to extinction, and seals were gone from much of the coast. Haast's eagle, the largest known species of eagle, which lived in the South Island and had preyed primarily on moa, became extinct sometime in the 15th century, about the same time as moa.

Māori daily life was dictated by the season. The planting season was in October and the harvest in February. The trapping of rats and birds was commonly practised by the forest tribes. Despite a relatively small population, the tribes claimed ownership of the entire island, periodically visiting land to substantiate claims.

For Māori, the land was not merely a resource, but a connection to ancestors. The mana of the tribe was strongly associated with the lands of that tribe. From this came the Māori proverb "Man perishes, but the land remains." The Māori beliefs included atua, invisible spirits connected to natural phenomena such as rainbows, trees, or stones. A large number of kererū (pigeons) flocking to feed on the fruit of the miro is an indicator of the mana of the forest. Because of this, these birds were generally only hunted for special occasions; the feathers are worn by Māori women of high social status.

By the time Europeans arrived, Māori had some conservation traditions. Rāhui is a form of protection of natural resources that Māori implemented as a conservation measure and for other reasons.

=== Extinction of moa ===
New Zealand was home to several species of moa (Dinornithiformes) – large, flightless birds. All moa species became extinct following the arrival of Polynesians in the islands during the 13th century. Their extirpation was one of the final megafauna extinctions of the Late Pleistocene extinctions.

Two potential causes of Late Pleistocene extinctions have been proposed: climate change and human predation.[a] Most of the recent megafauna extinctions occurred after the arrival of humans, but proving cause-and-effect is difficult due to the fact the events happened long in the past. The nature of the extinctions varied between species and locations.

Scientific analysis of moa fossils and habitats indicate that their populations were stable and large prior to the arrival of humans. There is no evidence of a gradual decline in population, as might be caused by climate change. When Polynesians arrived, the moa population of New Zealand was estimated to be about 9,200 individuals. Archaeological evidence shows that humans hunted the moa. The moa were extirpated within 100 to 200 years after humans arrived. The extinction of the moa was the most rapid recorded (as of 2014) human-facilitated megafauna extinction. For these reasons, human hunting is most likely the only cause of the moa's extinction.

== Contemporary viewpoints ==
A Cultural Health Index for waterways has been developed that links Western science and the cultural knowledge of the Māori about stream health.

Māori belief holds that Tāne, the god of forests and birds, created the first man.

In Māori society, special status is granted to those known as the tangata whenua 'people of the land', or Māori who have resided in the local district for many generations. This is in contrast with the Māori that have no ancestral connection to the land, known variously as tangata haere mai 'people who have come in', rawaho 'outsiders' or tauiwi 'foreigners'. Depending on the remoteness of the community, the percentage of tangata haere mai can vary from as few as 5% to in excess of 70%. Today, the term tangata whenua is often used to broadly differentiate between Māori and other groups.

Another important aspect of the Māori's relationship with nature was the concept of tapu, a dangerous energy that had to be properly nullified through ritual. Every natural resource had this, meaning, at least in theory, that exploitation of natural resources was limited by tapu.

Māori land laws, which dictate equal partitioning of inheritances among children, have had the effect of preserving the land by making individual land blocks too small for economic use. Compounded with this, Māori of the older generation are culturally disinclined to sell their shares to developers, making cutting firewood or cultivating small gardens the primary economic activity on these lands.

Māori blame European prohibition laws, many of which were implemented during the colonial era, for usurping the mana and contributing to the declining biodiversity of New Zealand. In particular, Māori pointed to the continuing decline of the New Zealand pigeon in spite of prohibitions on hunting, claiming Tāne was removing them as they were no longer being used by the people. Regaining responsibility for the environment of New Zealand is seen not only as important from a conservation standpoint, but critical to truly be tangata whenua.

== Māori ecological knowledge ==
A team of researchers studied Māori traditional ecological knowledge of the tuatara, a reptile endemic to New Zealand through oral questioning of elders. This is particularly important because the tuatara is a living fossil, being the last living member of its taxonomic order. The tuatara had become extinct on the main island and exists only on 37 offshore islands. The elders' testimony correctly matched existing scientific knowledge regarding the physiology, diet, range, and behaviour. The researchers concluded that, "In at least some cases, traditional ecological knowledge may persist as species decline and may serve as a valuable source of ecological information for conservation." In addition, they discovered seven more sites that the tuatara inhabited in recent times from this testimony.

Culturally, the tuatara are generally considered a bad omen, though 20% of elders report tuatara being kept as pets. Tuatara, which have a primitive "third eye" and a long natural lifespan, are believed to have great knowledge and ability to see hidden things. Conversely, elders of the Ngai Wai Iwi report putting the reptiles under their shirts to stay cool. In the paper, Ramstad concludes, "Our current understanding of Māori attitudes toward tuatara needs revising to accommodate this heterogeneity in traditional ecological knowledge. Not all Māori fear tuatara, not all iwi subsisted historically on tuatara, and the cultural role of tuatara differs over time and among iwi."

== Legal status of geographic locations ==
Today, approximately one third of New Zealand is under the mandate of the Department of Conservation. Whanganui River was recognized as having the same legal status as a person by the government of New Zealand in 2017, ending the country's longest running litigation, which had begun 160 years ago. Prior to European settlement, the river was important for being easily navigable, which allowed widespread settlements through the Whanganui River valley. Prior to European colonization, this region was the most densely populated on the North Island. Regarding this status, the lead negotiator for the Whanganui tribe, Gerrard Albert, said "The reason we have taken this approach is because we consider the river an ancestor and always have. ... We can trace our genealogy to the origins of the universe, and therefore rather than us being masters of the natural world, we are part of it." Two legal guardians, one from the tribe and one from the New Zealand government, were appointed. A Māori MP, Adrian Rurawhe, stated that, "From a Whanganui viewpoint the wellbeing of the river is directly linked to the well-being of the people," referring to the mana of the tangata whenua.

Mount Taranaki was granted similar legal status in 2025, with eight tribes and the New Zealand government acting as legal guardians. The Minister for treaty negotiations, Andrew Little, said of the decision, "Today's agreements are a major milestone in acknowledging the grievances and hurt from the past as the Taranaki iwi experienced some of the worst examples of Crown behaviour in the 19th century". Part of what is now Tongariro National Park was given to the Crown by the Māori chief Te Heuheu Tukino IV to ensure its protection.

== Haka kererū ==
The haka kererū was a ceremonial dance that "served to make the connection between the environment and the people, and points to the fundamental platform of life and existence—Papatūānuku (Mother Earth)". During its last recorded performance in 1972, "huahua (preserved kererū)" was served. The haka references the ecological devastation caused by European colonists. The exact words vary as individuals tailored them to their own dialects:

Māori	English
Ka aroha te puke e tu iho nei	I am saddened by the hills that surround me
Ka horehore, ka horehore	They are barren, they are barren
Ka aroha te puke e tu iho nei	I am saddened by the hill that surround me
Ka horehore, ka horehore	They are barren, they are barren
He aha i hore ai?	Why is it so bare?
He kore kai pea	Perhaps because there is no food to be had
A me aha?	What shall we do?
Me kai pea ko nga raho o (name of a chief)	Let's consider eating the testicles of (name of chief)
Ka horehore, ka horehore	They are barren, they are barren
Ā neke neke hia	Alas, keep moving, keep moving
Ā, ē	Alas

An alternative version also exists.

Māori	English
He kumara kai hamuhamu	Only the fernroots remain
Ko te ehu o te kupu nei na	The essential word implies
Kia hoki kau atu, ina te tinaki	That we return to till the soil
Taia mai, ka mate, taia mai	We haul it back, no good, we haul it back
Ka horehore, ka horehore	Absolutely barren, absolutely barren
Ka mate te puke tu iho nei	The hills beyond me are barren
Ka horehore, ka horehore	Absolutely barren, absolutely barren
He kotahi te kete i kimihia	We have only but one basket
Kei te kore, kore rawa aku iwi	There was virtually nothing for my people
Ki te mahi kai - i	To prepare for a feast.

== See also ==
- Conservation in New Zealand
- Environmental movement in New Zealand
