= Elizabeth Rata =

New Zealand academic

Dame Elizabeth Rata DNZM
- Rata in 2026
- Born: Elizabeth Mary Frazer; 16 March 1952 (age 74)
- Spouse: Te Ika Jack Rata (m. 1986; died 1987)
- Relatives: Matiu Rata (brother-in-law)

Academic background
- Education: University of Auckland
- Thesis: Global capitalism and the revival of ethnic traditionalism in New Zealand : the emergence of tribal-capitalism (1996)

Dame Elizabeth Mary Rata DNZM (née Frazer; born 16 March 1952) is a New Zealand academic who is a sociologist of education and a professor in the School of Critical Studies in Education at the University of Auckland. Her views and research on Māori education and the place of indigenous knowledge in the New Zealand education system have received criticism from other academics, as per the academic process. In 1986, she married Te Ika Jack Rata (7 December 1932 – 24 February 1987), the older brother of politician Matiu Rata. Elizabeth is Pākehā, noting that her "ancestors were all Pākehā".

== Academic career ==
Rata gained both her MEd and PhD from the University of Auckland. Her master's thesis, Maori survival and structural separateness: the history of Te Runanga o nga Kura Kaupapa Maori o Tamaki Makaurau 1987–1989, and her doctoral thesis, Global capitalism and the revival of ethnic traditionalism in New Zealand: the emergence of tribal-capitalism, relate to biculturalism in New Zealand. After a Senior Fulbright Scholarship to Georgetown University, Washington, DC in 2003, she returned to Auckland, becoming a professor in 2017. Rata is the director of the Knowledge in Education Research Unit (KERU) at the University of Auckland, which she established in 2010.

In 2013 Rata published an opinion piece on the New Zealand school secondary curriculum decrying the lack of explicit knowledge and a "focus on skills and the process of learning". The piece was directly criticised by authors such as Steve Maharey and Jane Gilbert.

Rata was one of the principal figures in developing the kura kaupapa schooling project. She was the secretary of the combined kōhanga reo whānau seeking to develop continuation for Māori language learners graduating from kōhanga reo and was a member of the original Kura Kaupapa Māori Working Party. However, according to Rebecca Wirihana, herself an early Kura activist, "Elizabeth has been wiped out of the history of kura kaupapa". Her recent criticisms of the direction of Māori immersion education, and of the insertion of mātauranga Māori into New Zealand education, prompted some critical responses.

Rata was the winner of the British Educational Research Association (BERA) Paper of the Year in 2012 for her article about knowledge in education. In that year her book The Politics of Knowledge in Education was published by Routledge. The work signalled the shift in focus from her earlier research about ethnic politics to include knowledge in education. Rata's research about knowledge in education, specifically the school curriculum is best known for her development of the Curriculum Design Coherence Model (CDC Model). A 2021 research paper published in Review of Education provides a detailed account of the use of the CDC Model in the international Knowledge-Rich School Project.

In July 2021, in the context of a review of the NCEA (New Zealand's National Curriculum), Rata, along with six other University of Auckland professors and emeritus professors published a controversial letter entitled "In Defence of Science" in the New Zealand Listener, which said indigenous knowledge (or mātauranga Māori) "falls far short of what can be defined as science itself".

In April 2024, Associate Education Minister David Seymour appointed Rata to the Charter School|Kura Hourua Establishment Board, which was tasked with facilitating the reestablishment of charter schools in New Zealand by early 2025.

In the 2026 King’s Birthday Honours, Rata was appointed a Dame Companion of the New Zealand Order of Merit, for services to education.

== Selected works ==
- Rata, Elizabeth. A political economy of neotribal capitalism. Lexington Books, 2000.
- Rata, Elizabeth. "Late capitalism and ethnic revivalism: A New Middle Age'?." Anthropological Theory 3, no. 1 (2003): 43–63.
- Rata, Elizabeth. "Rethinking biculturalism." Anthropological Theory 5, no. 3 (2005): 267–284.
- Li, Tania Murray, Baviskar Amita, Rob Cramb, Kaushik Ghosh, Rusaslina Idrus, Pauline E. Peters, Nancy Postero, Elizabeth Rata, and Irina Wenk. "Indigeneity, capitalism, and the management of dispossession." Current Anthropology 51, no. 3 (2010): 385–414.
- Rata, Elizabeth. "The politics of knowledge in education." British Educational Research Journal 38, no. 1 (2012): 103–124.
- Rata, Elizabeth. Knowledge and Teaching, British Educational Research Journal. 43(5), 1003–1017. 2017
- Rata, E. Ethnic Revival. In Fathali M. Moghaddam Ed. The SAGE Encyclopedia of Political Behavior, (pp. 265–268). Thousand Oaks, California: Sage Publications. 2017.
- Rata, Elizabeth. Knowledge-Rich Teaching: A Model of Curriculum Design Coherence, British Educational Research Journal. 45: (2019) 681–697.
- Rata, Elizabeth. "The Curriculum Design Coherence Model in the Knowledge-Rich School Project". Review of Education 9, no. 2 (1 June 2021): 448–95.
- Rata, Elizabeth, and Tauwehe Sophie Tamati. Academic achievement in bilingual and immersion education: TransAcquisition pedagogy and curriculum design. Routledge, 2021.
- Rata, Elizabeth. ‘What Is a Knowledge-Rich Curriculum?’ The New Zealand Annual Review of Education 26 (1 July 2021): 29–35.
