= Doug Elliffe =

New Zealand academic

- Born: Douglas Mark Elliffe
- Education: University of Auckland
- Scientific career
- Workplaces: University of Auckland
- Thesis: Multiple-schedule performance in closed economies (1990)

Douglas Mark Elliffe is a New Zealand psychology academic, and as of 2021 is a full professor at the University of Auckland.

== Academic career ==
After a PhD titled Multiple-schedule performance in closed economies at the University of Auckland, and joined the staff, rising to full professor.

In July 2021, in the context of a review of the NCEA (New Zealand's National Curriculum), Elliffe, along with six other University of Auckland Professors and Emeritus Professors published a controversial letter "In Defence of Science" in the New Zealand Listener.

== Selected works ==
- Taylor, Alex H., Douglas Elliffe, Gavin R. Hunt, and Russell D. Gray. "Complex cognition and behavioural innovation in New Caledonian crows." Proceedings of the Royal Society B: Biological Sciences 277, no. 1694 (2010): 2637–2643.
- Alsop, B. and Elliffe, D., 1988. Concurrent‐schedule performance: Effects of relative and overall reinforcer rate. Journal of the Experimental Analysis of Behavior, 49(1), pp. 21–36.
- Taylor, Alex H., Douglas M. Elliffe, Gavin R. Hunt, Nathan J. Emery, Nicola S. Clayton, and Russell D. Gray. "New Caledonian crows learn the functional properties of novel tool types." PLOS ONE 6, no. 12 (2011): e26887.
- Elliffe, Douglas, and Brent Alsop. "Concurrent choice: Effects of overall reinforcer rate and the temporal distribution of reinforcers." Journal of the Experimental Analysis of Behavior 65, no. 2 (1996): 445–463.
- Butler, Rynae, Rebecca J. Sargisson, and Douglas Elliffe. "The efficacy of systematic desensitization for treating the separation-related problem behaviour of domestic dogs." Applied Animal Behaviour Science 129, no. 2-4 (2011): 136–145.
