= Garth Cooper =

Biology researcher in New Zealand

- Education: University of Oxford
- Scientific career
- Thesis: The characterisation of amylin and analysis of its role in diabetes mellitus (1989)
- Doctoral advisor: Kenneth B. M. Reid

Garth James Smith Cooper is a New Zealand academic biochemist, and as of 2021 is a full professor at the University of Auckland.

== Early life ==
Cooper is of Pākehā (European) and Ngāti Māhanga Māori descent. He speaks English, but not Māori, as his Māori grandmother thought he should learn English. He received schooling in New Zealand. He studied at the University of Auckland starting in 1969, and gained a BSc in Chemistry and Biochemistry (1971), a BSc in Human Biology (1975) and medical degrees (MB ChB, 1978).

== Career ==
Cooper worked as a medical officer in Rotorua in 1979 and 1980, then in Auckland from 1981 to 1985, including several years based in Middlemore Hospital in South Auckland. He and David Scott pioneered a programme for a new approach to health care delivery in Ōtara from 1983 to 1985. He wrote and delivered the first course in New Zealand for lay community health workers, which was recognised by the Mayor of South Auckland (1985). The programme was developed at the Whaiora Marae in Ōtara, where Cooper worked part-time.

He did doctoral studies at the University of Oxford from 1986 to 1989 and was awarded a PhD for his thesis titled The characterisation of amylin and analysis of its role in diabetes mellitus.

Cooper was a founder and the chief technical officer of Amylin Pharmaceuticals Inc. in California until 1992. He returned to New Zealand and the University of Auckland in 1993, rising to full professor. In his role as Professor in Biochemistry and Medicine (1995–present), he has developed courses for young Māori and Pasifika students as part of the University of Auckland's Māori and Pacific Admission Scheme programmes. He has been a member of the Maori Health Committee and the Research Policy Advisory Committee of the Health Research Council of New Zealand.

He was elected a Fellow of the Royal Society of New Zealand in 1998 and a Fellow of the Academy of Medical Sciences in 2013. He was awarded a Doctor of Science degree by the University of Oxford in 2017, based on his more than 200 publications, mainly in the field of diabetes and metabolic disease.

Cooper was involved in the Listener letter on science controversy in 2021, as one of the signatories to the initial letter. He and two other signatories, who were Royal Society fellows, were investigated by the Royal Society. In response, the Free Speech Union started a fund to support Cooper and another one of the fellows.

== Selected works ==
- Xu, A., Wang, Y., Keshaw, H., Xu, L.Y., Lam, K.S. and Cooper, G.J., 2003. The fat-derived hormone adiponectin alleviates alcoholic and nonalcoholic fatty liver diseases in mice. The Journal of clinical investigation, 112(1), pp. 91–100.
- Cooper, G.J., Willis, A.C., Clark, A., Turner, R.C., Sim, R.B. and Reid, K.B., 1987. Purification and characterization of a peptide from amyloid-rich pancreases of type 2 diabetic patients. Proceedings of the National Academy of Sciences, 84(23), pp. 8628–8632.
- Clark, A., Wells, C.A., Buley, I.D., Cruickshank, J.K., Vanhegan, R.I., Matthews, D.R., Cooper, G.J., Holman, R.R. and Turner, R.C., 1988. Islet amyloid, increased A-cells, reduced B-cells and exocrine fibrosis: quantitative changes in the pancreas in type 2 diabetes. Diabetes research (Edinburgh, Scotland), 9(4), pp. 151–159.
- Leighton, B. and Cooper, G.J., 1988. Pancreatic amylin and calcitonin gene-related peptide cause resistance to insulin in skeletal muscle in vitro. Nature, 335(6191), pp. 632–635.
