= Kendall Clements =

New Zealand biologist

- Born: Kendall David Clements
- Education: James Cook University
- Scientific career
- Thesis: Gut microorganisms of surgeonfishes (family Acanthuridae) (1991)
- Doctoral advisor: Howard Choat
- Doctoral students: Maren Wellenreuther

Kendall David Clements is a New Zealand academic and as of 2021 is a full professor at the University of Auckland specialising in the ecology and evolution of fish.

== Career ==
Clements completed a Bachelor of Science at Victoria University Wellington in 1981 and a Master of Science (Honours) at the University of Auckland, New Zealand in 1985. He completed a PhD in 1991 titled 'Gut microorganisms of surgeonfishes (family Acanthuridae)' at James Cook University. He was a recipient of the Lizard Island Doctoral Fellowship, funded by the Australian Museum.

Clements then moved to work at the University of Auckland, becoming a full professor in 2012. Clements is an expert in marine fish ecology and taxonomy, particularly focusing on herbivory in coral reef fishes, and the phylogeny and taxonomy of Kyphosidae (sea chubs) and triplefins.

In 2018, Clements and Associate Professor Lindsey White (Auckland University of Technology) were awarded an Endeavour Grant from the New Zealand government titled "Microbial conversion of kelp to high nitrogen plant and animal feeds." The grant provided $6 million NZD to the project team until 2024 to investigate converting kelp into agricultural feed.

In July 2021, in the context of a review of the NCEA (New Zealand's National Curriculum), Clements was lead author of a controversial letter "In Defence of Science" in the New Zealand Listener. He also co-authored an opinion piece on academic freedom in universities in 2024.

Notable doctoral students of Clements include Maren Wellenreuther.

== Selected works ==
- Choat, J., Clements, K. and Robbins, W., 2002. The trophic status of herbivorous fishes on coral reefs. Marine Biology, 140(3), pp. 613–623.
- Angert, Esther R., Kendall D. Clements, and Norman R. Pace. "The largest bacterium." Nature 362, no. 6417 (1993): 239–241.
- Choat, John Howard, and K. D. Clements. "Vertebrate herbivores in marine and terrestrial environments: a nutritional ecology perspective." Annual Review of Ecology and Systematics 29, no. 1 (1998): 375–403.
- Choat, J., K. Clements, and W. Robbins. "The trophic status of herbivorous fishes on coral reefs." Marine Biology 140, no. 3 (2002): 613–623.
