= John Werry =

New Zealand psychiatry academic (1931–2025)

John Werry CNZM
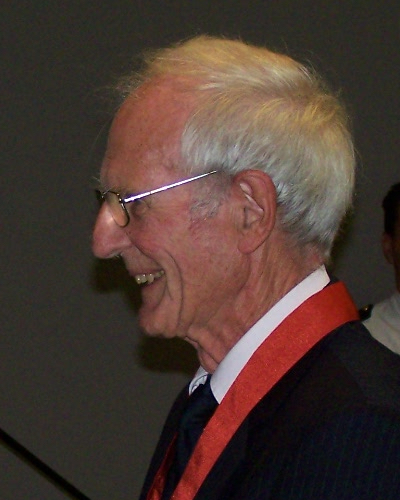
- Werry in 2009
- Born: John Scott Werry; 30 January 1931; Christchurch, New Zealand
- Died: 26 July 2025 (aged 94); Auckland, New Zealand
- Education: University of Otago
- Scientific career
- Workplaces: Montreal Children's Hospital; University of Illinois; University of Auckland
- Thesis: Placebo, methylphenidate, haloperidol and imipramine in disturbed children : some methodological, experimental and clinical studies (1974)

John Scott Werry CNZM (30 January 1931 – 26 July 2025) was a New Zealand psychiatry academic. He was an emeritus professor at the University of Auckland.

== Early life and family ==
Born in Christchurch on 30 January 1931, Werry was the son of Chase Cheneworth Werry and Edith Kathleen Werry (née Scott). He grew up in Wyndham, Ashburton, and Dannevirke. He was educated at Ashburton High School and Dannevirke High School, where he was dux in 1948 and earned a university national scholarship.

== Academic career ==
Werry studied at the University of Otago, graduating with a Bachelor of Medical Sciences degree in 1953, and MB ChB in 1955. He then worked in Montreal Children's Hospital and University of Illinois in North America before returning to New Zealand and the University of Auckland where he rose to emeritus professor. In 1974, Werry earned the degree of Doctor of Medicine from the University of Otago, with a thesis titled Placebo, methylphenidate, haloperidol and imipramine in disturbed children : some methodological, experimental and clinical studies.

In July 2021, in the context of a review of the NCEA (New Zealand's National Curriculum), Werry, along with six other University of Auckland professors and emeritus professors published a controversial letter "In Defence of Science" in the New Zealand Listener.

Werry died at Auckland Hospital on 26 July 2025, at the age of 94.

== Honours and awards ==
In the 2009 New Year Honours, Werry was appointed a Companion of the New Zealand Order of Merit, for services to child and adolescent psychiatry. He was a Fellow of the Royal Australian and New Zealand College of Psychiatrists, and a Fellow of the Royal College of Physicians of Canada (Psychiatry and Behavioural Science).

== Selected works ==
- Volkmar, Fred R., Ami Klin, Bryna Siegel, Peter Szatmari, Catherine Lord, Magda Campbell, B. J. Freeman et al. "Field trial for autistic disorder in DSM-IV." The American journal of psychiatry (1994).
- Werry, John Scott, Jon M. McClellan, and Linda Chard. "Childhood and adolescent schizophrenic, bipolar, and schizoaffective disorders: a clinical and outcome study." Journal of the American Academy of Child & Adolescent Psychiatry 30, no. 3 (1991): 457–465.
- Reeves, Jan C., John S. Werry, Gail S. Elkind, and Alan Zametkin. "Attention deficit, conduct, oppositional, and anxiety disorders in children: II. Clinical characteristics." Journal of the American Academy of Child & Adolescent Psychiatry 26, no. 2 (1987): 144–155.
- Weiss, Gabrielle, Klaus Minde, John S. Werry, Virginia Douglas, and Elizabeth Nemeth. "Studies on the hyperactive child: VIII. Five-year follow-up." Archives of General Psychiatry 24, no. 5 (1971): 409–414.
- Werry, John S. "Developmental hyperactivity." Pediatric Clinics of North America 15, no. 3 (1968): 581–599.
