= Isabel Castro (biologist) =

New Zealand wildlife biologist

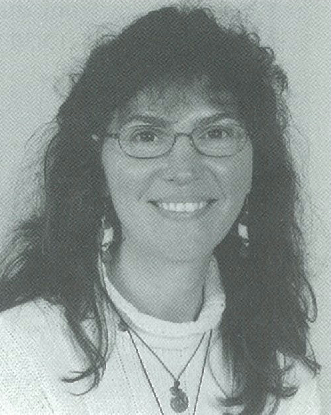
- Castro in 2004

Academic background
- Education: Massey University
- Thesis: Behavioural ecology and management of Hihi (Notiomystis cincta), an endemic New Zealand honeyeater (1995)
- Doctoral advisor: Edward Minot; Robin Fordham; Brian Springett

Isabel Castro is professor of wildlife biology at Massey University in New Zealand. Her research focuses on conservation biology, primarily of birds and native ecosystems, but also including invertebrates and introduced mammals. She is a principal investigator in the Te Pūnaha Matatini Centre of Research Excellence.

== Academic career ==
Castro has a Bachelor of Science in microbiology from the University of Los Andes, and a Master of Science in environmental biology from Eastern Illinois University. She completed a PhD titled Behavioural ecology and management of Hihi (Notiomystis cincta), an endemic New Zealand honeyeater at Massey University in 1995. Castro joined the faculty, and was promoted to full professor in 2021.

Castro's research is around conservation of island species and ecosystems. She studies conservation biology, behavioural ecology, parasites and pathogens and technology for conservation. While her focus is mainly on birds, she has also worked on land snails and introduced mammals.

Castro was named Fellow of the International Ornithologists Union in 2022. Castro is a principal investigator in Te Pūnaha Matatini Centre of Research Excellence. She is a core member of the collaborative project AviaNZ and a member of the Kiwi Recovery Group, Wildbase and the NZ Banding Advisory Committee. She gave training in wildlife monitoring to workers on an award-winning Bay of Islands conservation project, and was part of a collaborative project with Plant & Food Research to determine if native birds can control orchard pests.

Castro has written a guide to the birds of the Galapagos Islands a book introduction to field biostatistics and a children's book about kiwi.

== Selected works ==
- Priyadarshani, Nirosha; Marsland, Stephen; Castro, Isabel (2018). "Automated birdsong recognition in complex acoustic environments: a review". Journal of Avian Biology. 49 (5): jav-01447. doi:10.1111/jav.01447. Wikidata Q118180479.
- Armstrong, Douglas Peter; Castro, Isabel; Griffiths, Richard Alun (2007). "Using adaptive management to determine requirements of re-introduced populations: the case of the New Zealand hihi". Journal of Applied Ecology. 44 (5): 953–962. doi:10.1111/j.1365-2664.2007.01320.x. Wikidata Q104089951.
- Armstrong, Douglas Peter; R. Scott Davidson; Dimond, Wendy Jane; Perrott, John K.; Castro, Isabel; Ewen, John G.; Griffiths, Richard Alun; Jason Taylor (2003). "Population dynamics of reintroduced forest birds on New Zealand islands". Journal of Biogeography. 29 (5–6): 609–621. doi:10.1046/j.1365-2699.2002.00710.x. Wikidata Q113348655.
- Howe, Laryssa; Castro, Isabel; Schöner, Ellen Renate; Hunter, Stuart; Barraclough, Rosemary K.; Alley, Maurice Rewi (2011). "Malaria parasites (Plasmodium spp.) infecting introduced, native and endemic New Zealand birds". Parasitology Research. 110 (2): 913–923. doi:10.1007/s00436-011-2577-z. PMC 3264853. PMID 21842389. Wikidata Q35691024.
- Castro, Isabel; Brunton, Dianne Heather; Karen M Mason; Brice Ebert; Griffiths, Richard Alun (2003). "Life history traits and food supplementation affect productivity in a translocated population of the endangered Hihi (Stitchbird, Notiomystis cincta)". Biological Conservation. 114 (2): 271–280. doi:10.1016/s0006-3207(03)00046-6. Wikidata Q118180508.
- Castro, Isabel C. (1996). A guide to the birds of the Galapagos Islands. Antonia Phillips. Princeton, N.J.: Princeton University Press. ISBN 0-691-01225-3. OCLC 35174866.
