= Toscanini's =

Ice cream parlor, Cambridge, Massachusetts

Coordinates: 42°21′48.6″N 71°5′57.5″W

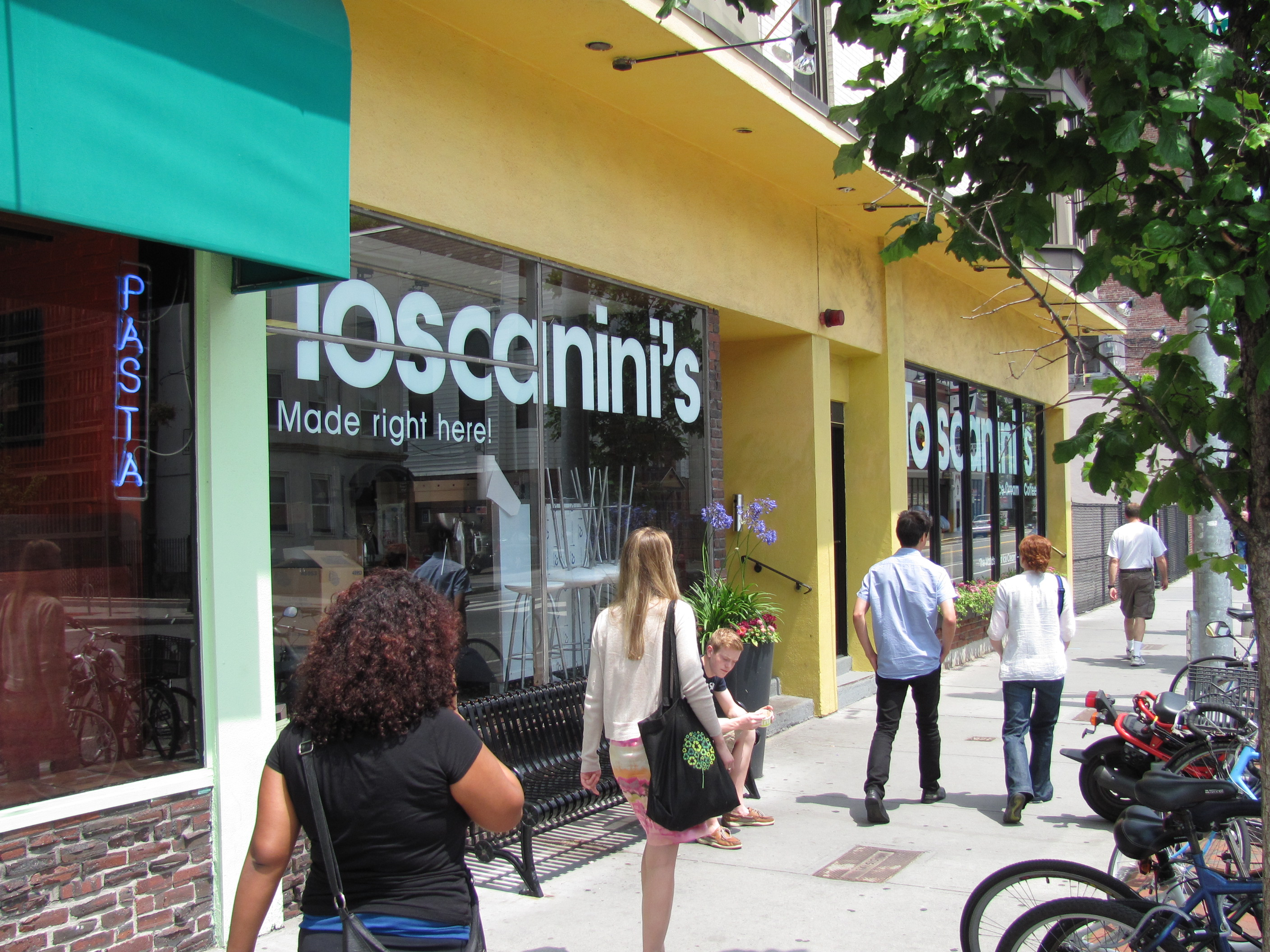
Toscanini's

Toscanini's Ice Cream Company (known simply as Toscanini's or Tosci's) is an ice cream parlor and café in Cambridge, Massachusetts, founded in 1981. It has won the Best of Boston award for best ice cream in 1997, 2009, and 2010, as well as other Best of Boston awards. It has also been highly rated in Gourmet magazine, and has been highly rated in The New York Times food section.

== Ice cream flavors ==
Toscanini's offers a rotating menu of creative ice cream flavors, and the current flavors in stock at each store are updated in real time on their website, which also offers entertaining descriptions of the flavors.

== History ==
Toscanini's original location is at 899 Main St. in Central Square. In January 2018, another location opened near Kendall Square at 159 First St while the Main St. store underwent renovations. The Main St. store reopened in January 2022. Other locations in the past have included the Someday Café in Somerville, Massachusetts (closed August 2006), a location in the MIT student center, and a location on Massachusetts Avenue in Harvard Square (closed December 2006).

In 2006, owner Gus Rancatore published an Amazon Short with author Helen Epstein, entitled Ice Cream Man: 25 Years at Toscanini's, presenting a personal story of how Toscanini's came to be.

=== Seizure by the Massachusetts DOR ===
On January 17, 2008, the business was seized by the Massachusetts Department of Revenue because of failure to pay more than $167,000 in taxes dating back to 2000. Ice cream maker Samuel Mehr set up a website with a PayPal donation link, and an overwhelming amount of support from the local community and beyond provided the owners with more than $30,000 toward satisfying the tax bill. A payment plan was organized with the MA DOR to pay the balance. After being closed for eight days, Toscanini's Ice Cream and Coffee Shop re-opened for business on January 25.
