= Te Pūnaha Matatini =

New Zealand research centre

Coordinates: 36.85°S 174.77°E

- Country: New Zealand
- Key people: Priscilla Wehi (Co-Director); Markus Luczak-Roesch (Co-Director); Michael O'Sullivan (Deputy Director); Tom Roa (Kaumātua)
- Established: 2015
- Website: www.tepunahamatatini.ac.nz

Te Pūnaha Matatini is the New Zealand Centre of Research Excellence for complex systems. Te Pūnaha Matatini is funded by the Tertiary Education Commission, hosted by the University of Auckland, and works in partnership with fifteen universities and organisations. Te Pūnaha Matatini brings together 100 principal investigators from tertiary institutions, government institutes, private sector organisations and marae communities from throughout New Zealand.

== Establishment ==
The New Zealand Government developed the Centres of Research Excellence (CoREs) in 2001 based on "international evidence that research is more likely to be successful (in terms of quality, relevance and impact) if there is a critical mass of researchers who work together to share skills, knowledge and resources". In 2012, two researchers, Shaun Hendy and Dion O'Neale began discussing how a collaborative, complex research system could make an impact, and in 2013 a proposal was submitted to the Centre of Research Excellence. After being interviewed by the Royal Society of New Zealand, it was announced in 2014 that Te Pūnaha Matatini Centre for Complex Systems and Networks, to be located in the Faculty of Science, Auckland University, was confirmed as one of the new Centres of Research Excellence (CoREs). Adam Jaffe, in 2017, at the end of a five-year tenure as Director of Motu Economic and Public Policy Research, discussed the importance of the work Motu had done in assisting with the setting up of Te Pūnaha Matatini. He said it was one his "proudest achievements...[because]...it allows economists, physicists, mathematicians and ecologists to share different ways of approaching and quantifying the impact of networks...[and]... the joint innovation and productivity research has real potential to improve the complex systems that affect people's lives and livelihoods".

Funded by the Tertiary Education Commission, Te Pūnaha Matatini aimed to be a collaborative partnership that brought together "New Zealand's leading researchers in physics, economics, mathematics, biology, computer science, operations management, statistics, and social science to study complex systems and networks in the biosphere, the economy, and the marketplace".

== Structure ==
Te Pūnaha Matatini is structured around three Communities of Inquiry (COI) that provide leadership and community around key practices that are fundamental for how they do their research:

- Complexity COI
- Culture of Research Excellence COI
- Engagement COI

From 2021–2024 Te Pūnaha Matatini has funded 16 core research projects, which are organised into four interrelated impact areas:

- Our changing climate
- Building a just and equitable society
- Better models and methods
- Human and environmental health and wellbeing

These research projects are funded as part of an annual grant of $4 million from the Tertiary Education Commission. Each of the ten currently-funded Centres of Research Excellence receives between $4–6.4 million in funding each year.

The organisation holds that its research spans the "breadth of human knowledge, from computational sciences to environmental economics, and from linguistics to indigenous philosophy to mathematical biology....celebrates the distinct status of Māori as tangata whenua, and is committed to upholding the principles of Te Tiriti o Waitangi".

Shaun Hendy was Director until June 2021, when he was replaced by Cilla Wehi. Since January 2024 the centre is co-directed by Wehi and Markus Luczak-Roesch. Operationally the organisation is structured with Kaumatua, an Executive Team, a Strategic Leadership Group, and Principal Investigators. Dr Andrea Byrom accepted the role of Kairangi (person held in high esteem) in 2021 and TPM Whānau has a role within the organisation as a network for emerging scientists in an "active transdisciplinary community, with a shared interest in complex systems and networks, comprising postgraduate students, postdocs and early career researchers from all over New Zealand". The 2022 Annual Report of Te Pūnaha Matatini recorded that in 2022 the organisation had 77 Principal Investigators, 233 TPM Whānau, an HQ Team of 4, and 1 Kaumātua.

Te Pūnaha Matatini has worked in partnership with Massey University, Victoria University of Wellington, University of Canterbury, Manaaki Whenua – Landcare Research and Motu Economic and Public Policy Research and in October 2020, The Tertiary Education Commission reconfirmed funding for seven years from 2021.

== Contribution to COVID-19 response in New Zealand ==
During the COVID-19 pandemic, a group of researchers brought together by Te Pūnaha Matatini developed mathematical models within different scenarios and provided data to inform the response of the New Zealand Government to the pandemic. Shaun Hendy, David Hayman and Michael Plank were among the high-profile members of the organisation who regularly commented on the COVID-19 pandemic in the news media at the time. The leadership of Te Pūnaha Matatini investigators has supported the setting up of independent research programmes, including Covid-19 Modelling Aotearoa and The Disinformation Project.

=== Modelling and commentary ===
In June 2020, modelling by Te Pūnaha Matatini had indicated that 83 per cent of New Zealanders would have needed to be vaccinated before other measures such as lockdowns were reduced but 97 per cent of the eligible people in the country would need both Pfizer jabs if the Delta variant spread. At the time, Shaun Hendy said it was unlikely that level of vaccine coverage would be reached. Principal Investigator Michael Plank said that just reaching a vaccination target would not give total default protection against the virus and "other communities which were hard to access or more at-risk to the virus might have lower rates of vaccination".

As Auckland faced a second lockdown in August 2021, Hendy noted the significance of identification of links to border cases as this indicated fewer cases spreading in the community. He later suggested that, despite a caveat to the prediction because of the possible effect of the opening some shops, modelling indicated that Auckland's outbreak could peak by November 2021. He said that the improving rate of vaccinations in the country might reduce the chance of the numbers increasing rapidly but a focus was needed on getting vulnerable rural communities vaccinated.

When Jacinda Ardern announced a possible re-opening of the borders between Australia and New Zealand in April 2022, Hendy said this was a "significant milestone" in the approach of New Zealand to COVID-19 and Michael Plank said it showed the benefit of the elimination strategies pursued in both countries. Their comments however were tempered by the possibility of there being an escalation of the virus in Australia. With the high transmissibility of the Delta variant being a concern, the modelling of Te Pūnaha Matatini continued to indicate that without good rates of vaccination to build population immunity, there could still be a substantial community outbreak that would put the healthcare system in New Zealand under immense strain.

By the middle of December 2021, Plank said he was troubled about the impact of the high transmissibility of the Omicron variant in New Zealand, and the case could be made for a review of the plans to open the border with Australia in 2022 due to an increase in cases in Sydney. When the Omicron COVID-19 variant was confirmed as likely to be circulating within New Zealand, Plank said that the modelling suggested an outbreak, and this would require careful management of isolation periods.

==== Selected publications ====
- Model-free estimation of COVID-19 transmission dynamics from a complete outbreak(2021). Using a dataset of epidemiologically linked cases of COVID-19 in New Zealand, this paper explored transmission dynamics of the virus that depended on factors such as age, and response to different control measures. The research showed that children and imported cases had a low probability of transmitting the virus, but superspreading event contributed significantly to the dynamics and this could be limited by border controls and social distancing measures.
- We built a model that shows how small rule changes can fuel delta's spread (2021). Members of Te Pūnaha Matatini COVID-19 modelling team looked at how small policy changes can result in widespread spread of COVID-19 through networks due to the percolation effects. The research published in the article showed even if there were only a small number of additional connections, an uncontrolled spread was likely to find unvaccinated people.
- Doughnuts and dandelions: Reimagining our food system post Covid-19 (2020) This article in The Spinoff looked at community initiatives in Auckland that were building resilient food systems that were socially inclusive and sustainable to deal with vulnerabilities in food chains as a result of COVID-restrictions. The writers said a healthier food system that supported more people was achievable in Aotearoa.
- Collective impact: Shining the light on community post Covid-19(2020) Researchers from Te Pūnaha Matatini looked at how New Zealand communities, as a result of the disruption caused by COVID-19 were becoming more vocal about what needed to change due to unequal access to resources and power and how this inequality was increasingly impacting on the health of people in diverse communities. It was suggested that the proposed Public Service Legislation Bill before parliament at the time may learn from COVID-19 to listen to the needs and aspirations of New Zealand communities.
- Estimated inequities in COVID-19 infection fatality rates by ethnicity for Aotearoa New Zealand (2020). This paper examined differential impacts of COVID-19 for high-risk groups within New Zealand, particularly Māori and Pasifika and concluded that the impacts of colonisation had contributed to inequities due to the marginalisation of these communities.

=== Reception of COVID-19 work ===
In May 2020, Samak Datta, a population modeller from National Institute of Water and Atmospheric Research (NIWA), was part of a team of experts appointed to review the modelling done by Te Pūnaha Matatini. Datta said that "COVID-19 models developed by the Te Pūnaha Matatini researchers tend to be stochastic...this means they use probabilities rather than exact numbers. Models like these are useful because they can be run many times to see best-case, worst-case and most-likely scenarios of potential COVID-19 spread".

When funding was reconfirmed in 2021, Dawn Freshwater acknowledged that the work of researchers from Te Pūnaha Matatini to the COVID-19 response underlined the importance of the Centres of Research Excellence. Andy Shenk, CEO of Uniservices, the research commercialisation and knowledge mobilisation company of the University of Auckland, said that modelling such as that done by Te Pūnaha Matatini offered "data-crunching power...[to]...sequence and compare virus genomes, which aids contact tracing".

Hendy was invited to present modelling at a press conference with Jacinda Ardern and Ashley Bloomfield on 23 September 2021 and he suggested that even with a high proportion of New Zealand's population vaccinated, up to 7000 deaths a year could be recorded. Ardern cautioned that the modelling was only one of the tools the government was using in its response to COVID-19. Rodney Jones, another modeller who had provided advice to the New Zealand Government, disputed the claims made by Hendy, saying that the model was implausible and there was no need to "scare New Zealanders into getting vaccinated". Hendy noted that the base model had been peer-reviewed earlier in the year, and did use "NZ-specific data on health outcomes", and Prime Minister Jacinda Ardern said she would use modelling as one of the tools to inform decisions for the health response, without it being a "singular pathway" resulting in an inevitable outcome. In 2022, the model was published in the peer-reviewed Nature-group journal Scientific Reports.

=== Awards ===
Te Pῡnaha Matatini was awarded the 2020 Prime Minister's Science Prize in recognition of their work in developing mathematical models, analysis of data and communication of the results to inform the response of the New Zealand Government to COVID-19. Shaun Hendy said that it had been an "unrepeatable experience" working with the team. As the New Zealand Prime Minister, Jacinda Ardern announced the award, she commented:

Even I underestimated the centrality of [science] advice for me, in this time in office, and just how important it would become to us as a government [and] I want to thank the many, many, many people in this room who were a part in your own ways in either helping us generate the information we needed to make those decisions, or who helped us communicate those decisions when it mattered most.

=== Covid-19 Modelling Aotearoa ===
In 2020, Shaun Hendy identified a gap in the science data being provided to the New Zealand Government to inform its response to COVID-19. He set up a multi-disciplinary team as part of Te Pūnaha Matatini that developed mathematical models in different scenarios for the position New Zealand was in early in the pandemic. This team became known as Covid-19 Modelling Aotearoa and has been a stand-alone project since 2021, funded as of 2022 by Manatū Hauora Ministry of Health. The modelling and analysis covered areas such as "hospital capability, contagion rates and likely disease spread, virus genomic tracing, contact tracing, and vaccination... translated for use by the government policymakers and front-line operators and helped inform the government's response to the Covid-19 pandemic". Hendy later noted that Peter-Lucas Jones from Te Aupōuri who was present at a Board meeting that confirmed the need to focus on COVID-19, told the story of how the 1918 influenza pandemic had affected his iwi and when statistician Andrew Sporle (Ngāti Apa, Rangitāne, Te Rarawa) was brought in to co-lead work focusing on at-risk communities an iwi-led pandemic response was shaped. Other researchers Associate Professor in Statistics Ilze Ziedins, Dr Mike O'Sullivan and Associate Professor Cameron Walker from the Faculty of Engineering worked on models to predict the effect on hospitals if the virus spread widely within New Zealand.

=== The Disinformation Project ===
Initially set up within Te Pūnaha Matatini in 2020, The Disinformation Project was an independent research programme that has analysed the seeding and spread of mis- and disinformation within New Zealand society from the early days of COVID-19 through to the aftermath of the occupation of the New Zealand parliament grounds. It was disestablished on 3 October 2024.
