= Dion O'Neale =

New Zealand applied mathematician

- Born: New Zealand
- Known for: Biological modelling during the COVID-19 pandemic
- Scientific career
- Fields: Applied mathematics; Biological modelling; Complex systems; Network science
- Workplaces: University of Auckland
- Thesis: Preservation of phase space structure in symplectic integration (2009)

Dion O'Neale is a New Zealand applied mathematician who specialises in the area of complex systems and network science. His work involves the analysis of empirical data to inform computer simulations to predict how interacting parts and structures of networks can affect the dynamics and properties of systems. During COVID-19, O'Neale created mathematical models to build understanding of how the network of interactions of the virus was spread, and during this period, was a frequent commentator in the New Zealand media about the country's response to the pandemic. He is a senior lecturer in physics at Auckland University, principal investigator at Te Pūnaha Matatini and Project Lead of COVID-19 Modelling Aotearoa.

== Education and career ==
Born in New Zealand, O'Neale studied at the University of Auckland between 1999 and 2003, graduating with a BSc in physics, BA in mathematics and BSc with honours in applied mathematics. He completed his MSc at Heinrich Heine University Düsseldorf in 2005, and PhD at Massey University in 2009. O'Neale was a postdoctoral research fellow at La Trobe University in Australia from August 2009 until April 2010, when he returned to New Zealand and joined the Applied Mathematics team at Industrial Research Limited, later known as Callaghan Innovation, in Lower Hutt, where he worked as a research scientist until 2013 when he became a research fellow and later lecturer with the department of physics at Auckland University. As of 2022 O'Neale continues in that role and since 2015 has been a principal investigator at Te Pūnaha Matatini. O'Neale has taken lead roles in several New Zealand government-funded research projects and in 2021 became the project lead for a programme called COVID-19 Modelling Aotearoa which initially arose under the leadership of Te Pūnaha Matatini but is now a standalone project hosted by the University of Auckland.

== Response to COVID-19 in New Zealand ==
=== Modelling and research ===
O'Neale was part of a team led by Michael Baker and funded in 2020 by the Health Research Council of New Zealand(HRC) for a 3-year research project: COVID-19 Pandemic in Aotearoa NZ: Impact, Inequalities & Improving our response. The goal of the project was to provide insights to the New Zealand Ministry of Health about how the virus was likely to severely affect people with existing health conditions and less able to afford health care. The application noted that Maori and Pasifika were disproportionately represented in this group so the response in New Zealand needed to be "effective and fair....[and the researchers undertook to]... communicate these insights to decision-makers at the Ministry of Health, service providers, communities, other Pacific nations, and the public in the form of practical recommendations to guide current and future pandemic responses".

Another funded programme led by O'Neale, Te matatini o te horapa: a population-based contagion network for Aotearoa NZ, undertook to build a model to simulate how COVID-19 could spread on contact networks, [by] "explicitly including individual demographic and economic attributes in the model..[and]...provide policy advice about vulnerability, what factors lead to increased risk, and what effective and equitable interventions would be. These ranged from behavioural changes and social support measures, to mitigate factors which [increased] transmission risk and inequities".

A paper co-authored by O'Neale and provided initially to officials on 16 November 2020, looked at modelling which possible non-pharmaceutical interventions would lead to elimination of COVID-19 if a case - not connected to the border - was found in the community. The study suggested that effective behaviours – other than testing and contract tracing – to improve the chances of possible elimination included increased levels of control in workplaces and the closing of schools. These findings were based on simulations of combination of multiple control measures and allowed "transmission routes via both 'close' and 'casual' contacts within each infection context, each with specific intervention-dependent reductions in transmission rate".

By 2021, the COVID-19 Modelling Aotearoa programme was established with funding initially from the Ministry of Business, Innovation and Employment, later the Department of the Prime Minister and Cabinet and as 2022, from the Manatū Hauora Ministry of Health. O'Neale is a Project Lead for Contagion Network Modelling within this programme. COVID-19 Modelling Aotearoa aimed at helping policy makers in developing responses to COVID-19 during a possible major outbreak in New Zealand, by "bringing together the multiple realms of public data collected for the census and from other public sources, and overlaying that with a COVID contagion model developed to represent both disease progression and interventions such as contact tracing and testing and the announcement and timing of Alert Levels". O'Neale explained that this mathematical approach originated in materials science and physics but had been previously applied to the epidemiology of disease when models were developed during the spread of Ebola in Africa. He said that the model had been useful during the lockdown of Auckland in August 2020 because it modelled the risk of a spread outside of the city and predicted the outcome if there was a change in the response. O'Neale's conclusion was that "the model proved spot on, offering politicians a degree of confidence on which to base their decisions".

In February 2021, the team at Te Pūnaha Matatini developed an "individual-based network contagion model" representing the population of New Zealand and the contexts in which they interracted, to "address the question of whether Alert Level 2.5 (AL2.5) [was] enough to eliminate a community outbreak with no clear epidemiological link to the border – like that seen in the 2020 Auckland August outbreak". The paper noted that the size of the outbreak at the beginning of a possible outbreak would affect the probability of elimination as would the impact of contact tracing, but concluded from the results of the simulation, that a move to Alert level 2.5 was unlikely to lead to elimination in a scenario similar to the 2020 outbreak in Auckland.

A report compiled in September 2021 and delivered on 17 August 2021, used the individual-based network contagion model to simulate the spread of COVID-19 in the community, considering a "case of community transmission with no link to the border....[on the assumption that]...each simulation was seeded by setting the state to infected (specifically to 'Exposed') for a single, randomly selected, individual in Auckland...[and]...around 15% of individuals over the age of 15 have been vaccinated". As Auckland responded to the outbreak of COVID-19, O'Neale contributed to a report delivered on 10 September 2021, that considered the consequence of reconnecting during transitions between phases and changes in Alert Level restrictions. The researchers used a network representing New Zealand, Populated Aotearoa Interaction Network (PAIN), to illustrate the number of interactions between people. The report found that only a "small increase in the number of connections between individuals from different dwellings (an increase from around 10% to around 20% of the number expected at Alert Level 1) was sufficient to increase the size of the largest connected component of the population who could be reached though transmission by a factor of 15; from around 90,000 to over 1.4 million...[highlighting]...the fact that New Zealand [was] a complex and highly connected system, where individuals [were] typically not too far removed from each other...[suggesting that]... Alert Levels, and specifically lock downs, work because they reduce the vast majority of interactions within the community and limit chains of potential transmission". By October 2021, the research team had used the model to estimate the effects of a proposed change in the response of the New Zealand Government to COVID-19 by developing a simulation of a community outbreak of the Delta variant detected in Auckland on 17 August 2021. The results indicated that without making any changes to the alert levels, there should be a "zero case day around the beginning of October, but that a zero case day [was] unlikely in the near term at lower levels of intervention".

=== Commentary ===
When the New Zealand Government announced in October 2021 that senior students would be able to return to high schools within Level 3 of the response to COVID-19, O'Neale agreed with some members of the education sector that it would to pose a risk for increasing case numbers, noting that the modelling suggested "most of the extra infections from schools reopening will actually show up in non-school contexts as a result of students subsequently infecting other people in their households or in other community interactions". He acknowledged that there was a strategy by the government to improve ventilation in schools and have a mask mandate, and recommended supporting these measures by bringing in rapid antigen testing.

As Omicron cases were detected at the border in late 2021, O'Neale noted that most future infections would be this variant and likely to leak out into the community, later warning that New Zealand should get prepared for a 'skyrocketing' in case numbers as happened in New South Wales which had similar rates of vaccination to New Zealand. He said in the interview that summer had meant schools were closed, people were on holiday and there were more outdoor activities which reduced transmissibility, but "the number of cases were likely to creep up once the immunity provided by the vaccine started to wane a little and people returned to work and schools". O'Neale said at this time that the numbers of COVID-19 cases could double every three days and modellers were making their predictions based on most of the cases being the Omicron variant which had a fast incubation period and would grow faster than Delta.

The New Zealand media reported on 14 February 2022, that the government was about to make a change in its approach to managing Omicron due to growing numbers of cases. O'Neale suggested this change was an acknowledgement that systems to manage the virus needed to change and the plan to shorten home isolation periods and good contact tracing for high risk cases was less restrictive than under previous levels.

On 16 February 2022, after a slight drop in numbers of cases of COVID-19 in New Zealand, O'Neale was one of modellers at Te Pūnaha Matatini who said that reported case numbers were doubling roughly every three days, with a possible tally in the community of around 4000 before the end of February. O'Neale explained the lag effect that meant a daily case number was often of cases reported more than a week previously. The modellers predicted a possible wave of three-to-four months, and with low transmission and a high rate of uptake of the booster vaccine, there could be "1.5m infections of which 386,400 were reported as cases" with numbers increasing if booster rates were low and transmission high". He later confirmed that the case numbers most likely reflected a backlog that had built up over the past week, a time he described as having "very noisy data due to data processing and testing systems being a bit up and down". O'Neale maintained that a peak in numbers was likely in mid to late March 2022.

The issue of COVID-19 spreading widely amongst young people in New Zealand was explained by O'Neale on 27 February 2022 as being expected in the "early stages of an outbreak...[because]...younger people, much more mobile and tending to go out a lot more and also tending to get symptoms at lower rates and so less likely to be tested, less likely to know they're infected, less likely to be isolating".

O'Neale clarified the importance of New Zealanders getting the booster vaccine shot to reduce the impact of the Omicron variant early in 2022, and said data from the UK had shown that after a booster, there was an increase of 20 percent effectiveness against infection to 60 percent. He later agreed with Helen Petousis-Harris and Michael Baker that David Seymour was not following the evidence by suggesting at the time that vaccine mandates could be removed. O'Neale said that having a booster dose remained the most effective way to protect against hospitalisations, and "asking people with high exposure risk due to their work to be vaccinated still [benefitted] the community".

After the New Zealand Government announced a roadmap to ease restrictions in the country on 21 February 2022, O'Neale predicted high case numbers as more people became exposed to Omicron, but ultimately it was how people behaved and high levels of booster vaccine uptake, saying that the government were being pragmatic in waiting until easing restrictions. When a journalist claimed at the time, that the New Zealand Government had accelerated the rate of the outbreak, O'Neale worried that the Government was "burying its head in the sand a little bit". According to O'Neale, the Government, being apparently comfortable in believing the country could weather the outbreak, was "misguided from an outbreak control perspective...[although]...it may well be that Omicron peaks and subsides without unduly burdening the health system". While another intended change at the time to shortened isolation periods was seen as necessary by some businesses, O'Neale explained that a shorter isolation period would increase the risk of the virus spreading more quickly, but was unlikely to have a "huge benefit in returning essential workers to the workforce, given there's been such incredibly wide uptake of businesses opting in to this essential worker classification". O'Neale agreed with updating the advice to encourage the wearing of higher quality masks to reduce airborne transmission, but was cautious about people eating and drinking inside and not wearing masks. Retaining COVID-19 pre-departure tests for overseas visitors was also seen by O'Neale as the correct approach at the time for New Zealand, despite some countries having done away with them. Reasons he gave for retaining these tests included preventing a rise in infection numbers due to travellers entering the country and possibly stalling the arrival of variants.

By March 2022, when Omicron had caused a major spike in daily cases, O'Neale urged New Zealanders to continue declaring test results so modellers could have confidence in the numbers they were putting out, as they needed data other than hospitalisation rates which were late on the "disease progression pipeline". With numbers of infections continuing to rise, predictions were made early in April 2022 by O'Neale that Auckland was likely to be in the "tail of infections, while other regions were still closer to their peak", and with an expected drop in case numbers after this, there could be "about 5000 new cases per day for the whole country if all the regions...managed to reach that plateau at the same time".

When New Zealand recorded more than one million cases of COVID-19 on the 10 May 2022, O'Neale and other modellers said that was an underestimation of infections, which were more likely to have been around three million. O'Neale noted this presented "challenges for New Zealand down the line – making it more difficult to predict subsequent waves, reinfection rates, or the burden of long Covid".

As New Zealand entered the Christmas holiday period in 2022 and it looked likely that COVID-19 numbers would increase, O'Neale as Co-lead of the Network Contagion Modelling programme at Auckland University, said that even though the pathogen might not be as serious as earlier ones, there could be bigger impacts on the health system as the modelling was suggesting one in 20 people could get the infection. He noted as many as 30 to 40 percent of infections were asymptomatic, and recommended people take rapid antigen tests as a precaution before going to social events or visiting people who were vulnerable.

== Selected publications and further research ==
- Transitivity and degree assortativity explained: The bipartite structure of social networks (2020). This research paper co-authored by O'Neal, showed how different processes in networks are related. The concluding claim of the research was that every social network could be expressed as a bipartite network, possibly through affiliations, memberships, or "accepting a friendship request on social media", and understanding the levels of transitivity and degree, would be "useful to improve studies and models of spreading phenomena on social networks, especially if group-based (bipartite)structures are considered".
- Social network analysis of obsidian artefacts and Māori interaction in northern Aotearoa New Zealand (2019). O'Neale collaborated on research that examined the evidence from social network analysis of obsidian recovered from sites in New Zealand, concluding that it documented how Māori society transformed over a period of 700 years from what historical accounts had described as "relatively autonomous village-based groups into larger territorial lineages, which later formed even larger geo-political tribal associations...[with]...subsequent changes in levels of interaction and social affiliation". In a press release prior to the research beginning, O'Neale said the aim was to look for patterns in the relationship between "archaeological sites, artefacts and obsidian sources" and hypothesize about how geography or social groupings produced the current distribution of obsidian. Shaun Hendy said the project showed how research was becoming more interdisciplinary and would make good use of the diverse range of networks in Te Pūnaha Matatini.
- Structure dynamics of evolving scientific networks (2020). This paper critically examined how co-authorship networks were affecting the evolution of scientific networks. Taking the position that a co-authored network was a one-mode projection of an original bipartite network where authors were connected to the papers they have written, the paper held that the understanding of the formation and structures of co-authored networks should take the properties of the original network into account.
- Power Law Distributions of Patents as Indicators of Innovation (2012). This paper acknowledged that while per capita production of patents was an important indicator of a country's innovation, there was also evidence suggesting that power laws could be a complementary measure of studying innovation and explaining variations between countries. Using simulations based on rules that generated power laws, an explanation was found for some of the variations across countries. Endogenous theories of growth, including the roles and inter-relationships of firms, were evaluated as measures of innovation and the researchers hypothesized that if distribution of firm sizes followed a power law, it would be valid to approach the consideration of innovation within the context of "distribution of patents within an economy rather than just the total number of patents itself".
- Structure of the Region-Technology Network as a Driver for Technological Innovation(2021). This is a paper co-authored by O'Neale that recorded the research findings of an international investigation into Agglomeration and spillovers as phenomena of technological innovation and drivers of regional economic growth. The research was based on the premise [that] "agglomeration effects occur when firms or people accrue benefit from being located near to one another, while knowledge spillovers are one process by which firms and individuals can derive such benefits, by taking advantage of new knowledge that has been created by others".
- Using network science to quantify economic disruptions in regional input-output networks (2019). O'Neale worked in a team that presented this paper on developing models which identified possible flow-on effects on economic systems because of natural hazards, specifically how to identify industries that had a large impact on an economic system when they were disrupted. The research considered how information, structures and connections of an industries-based business network could take a network science approach to developing a model that predicted and limited spillover effects. The results indicated to the researchers [it is] "foreseeable that increased data collection may make it possible to create networks at individual business level".
- Bourdieu, networks, and movements: Using the concepts of habitus, field and capital to understand a network analysis of gender differences in undergraduate physics (2019). This is published research into why there was an underrepresentation of women in science using the approach of combining network analysis of student enrolment data with the sociological theory of Pierre Bourdieu. The study found that female students enrol more in life science fields than male students, who were more likely to enrol in the Physics-Maths and Computer Science fields, possibly contributing to a perception that women were "unwelcome" in the field of science. The head of physics at the University of Auckland, Professor Richard Easther, said he was excited that his department had hosted this work [because] "it [helped] us to make evidence-based changes to our own practice, and the ways we present our subject to students". The findings of that study were confirmed in a 2021 project in which O'Neale participated, that used a direct network analysis approach to examine the choices students in New Zealand high schools made for their final year in Science, Technology, Engineering and Mathematics (STEM), and concluded from the data that females were well represented in the life sciences, but less so in physics, calculus, and vocational standards.
- Investigating the transmission risk of infectious disease outbreaks through the Aotearoa Co-incidence Network (ACN): a population-based study (2022). This paper showed that early in 2022, O'Neale was instrumental in establishing The Aotearoa Co-incidence Network (ACN) which used nationwide data in New Zealand to identify areas that have both high potential transmission risk and high vulnerability to infectious diseases. The study accepted that COVID-19 had restricted some immunisation programmes and it was important to get a better understanding of potential infectious disease transmission to help future policy and research respond to new and re-emerging infectious diseases.

== Awards ==
O'Neale was part of the team at Te Pūnaha Matatini that was awarded the 2020 Prime Minister's Science Prize in recognition of their work in developing data-based mathematical models to inform the New Zealand's response to COVID-19. Diane Abad-Vergara from the World Health Organization, said that the work done by Pūnaha Matatini "had significant health and social impacts for New Zealand...[and was]...part of the reason why New Zealand [was] one of the few countries to eliminate the virus."
