= Ziediņš =

Ziediņš or Ziedins is a surname of Latvian origin. Notable people with this name include:

- Ilze Ziedins, New Zealand statistician
- Māris Ziediņš (born 1978), Latvian ice hockey player
- Māris Ziediņš (basketball) (born 1990), Latvian basketball player
