= Shaun Hendy =

New Zealand nanotechnology researcher

Shaun Hendy MNZM FRSNZ
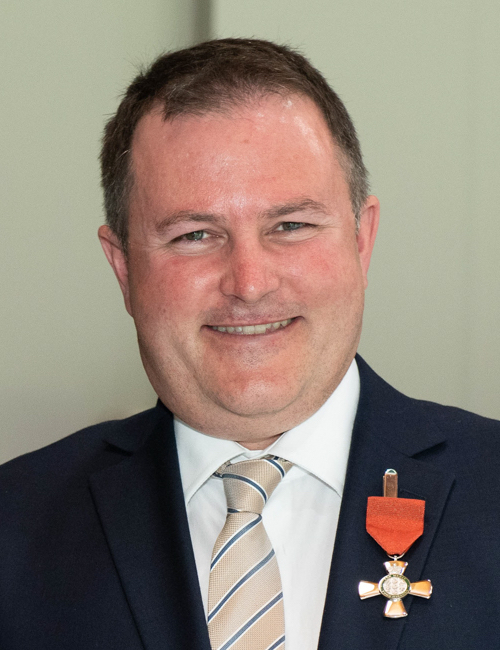
- Hendy in 2021
- Born: Shaun Cameron Hendy
- Education: Massey University (BSc); University of Alberta (PhD)
- Scientific career
- Fields: Physics, nanotechnology, complex systems, innovation
- Workplaces: Industrial Research Limited; Victoria University of Wellington; University of Auckland
- Thesis: Cosmic strings in black hole spacetimes (1998)
- Doctoral advisors: V.P. Frolov
- Website: Toha profile

Shaun Cameron Hendy MNZM FRSNZ is a New Zealand physicist. He is the chief scientist at climate innovation company Toha. He was previously a professor at the University of Auckland and was the first director of Te Pūnaha Matatini, a centre of research excellence in complex systems and data analytics. During the COVID-19 pandemic in New Zealand, he led a team of scientists developing mathematical models of the spread of the virus across the country that influenced the government's response to the outbreak.

== Early life and education ==
Hendy was raised in Palmerston North, and earned a Bachelor of Science in mathematics in 1992, and a Bachelor of Science with first-class honours in mathematical physics the following year. He went on to undertake doctoral studies in physics at the University of Alberta between 1994 and 1998. The title of his PhD thesis was Cosmic strings in black hole spacetimes.

== Career ==
After completing his PhD, Hendy went to work at Industrial Research Limited in Lower Hutt on a New Zealand Science and Technology post-doctoral fellowship. Hendy stayed on at Industrial Research until 2013. During that time, he also held a joint academic position at Victoria University of Wellington and served as deputy director of the MacDiarmid Institute for Advanced Materials and Nanotechnology based at the university. He continued to be involved with the institute on researching properties of advanced materials as well as the application of mathematical models to innovation.

Hendy has been a professor of physics at the University of Auckland. He led research on the computer modelling of nanostructures and how they could be applied to nanotechnology. He left the university in October 2022.

=== Te Pūnaha Matatini ===
Hendy was motivated to study the science of complex systems after hearing about the work of physicist Geoffrey West on the link between population distributions and innovation. He was the founder and first director of Te Pūnaha Matatini, a centre of research excellence in complex systems and data analytics, since 2015. It is one of five centres of research excellence hosted by the University of Auckland. Te Pūnaha Matatini develops tools to analyse data from a range of social, economic and biological systems, to inform and evaluate government policy and decision-making. In 2021 Hendy stepped down as the director of Te Pūnaha Matatini and as at 1 July 2021 Priscilla Wehi replaced him as director.

=== Science communication ===
Hendy is known in New Zealand for his science communication, often contributing to publications such as The Spinoff and Sciblogs.co.nz to discuss his latest research and issues related to science policy. He was awarded the Prime Minister's Prize for Science Media Communication in 2012. He is a former president of the New Zealand Mathematical Society.

In 2013, Hendy co-authored his first book with physicist Sir Paul Callaghan, discussing approaches to diversify and innovate New Zealand's economy. He has written a book on the role of scientists in public discourse and one on taking personal responsibility towards reducing the effects of climate change. He has written about his experience of cutting out all air travel for a year in an effort to reduce his carbon footprint and why individual action matters.

=== Coronavirus pandemic ===
During the COVID-19 pandemic, Hendy led a team of scientists at Te Pūnaha Matatini to study the spread of infection under various mitigation scenarios. His team's modelling showed that if no measures were taken, the coronavirus could infect 89 percent of the New Zealand population and kill 80,000 people. Subsequently, his team's advice to the government contributed to strong suppression measures across the country. His team continues to update their models based on new information and demonstrate the impact of the government's strict lockdown measures. In 2020 towards the end of the country's four-week lockdown, Hendy recommended it to be extended by two weeks to achieve the goal of eliminating the virus. He expressed concern about New Zealand's Anzac Day long weekend (25–27 April) encouraging a rise in social activity if the lockdown were eased before then, potentially spreading the virus further. His data and recommendations were among those considered by the government on 23 April before announcing the decision to extend the strict lockdown until 11:59pm on 27 April.

In late December 2021, Hendy and epidemiologist Siouxsie Wiles filed a complaint with the Employment Relations Authority against the University of Auckland for allegedly not protecting them from abuse by anti-lockdown and anti-vaccination elements. According to the authority, the pair had been harassed at home and work, and also received vitriolic personal responses. The pair had been raising concerns about their personal safety to the university since April 2020. The University of Auckland had responded by issuing a written statement in August 2021 advising them to minimise their public commentary and social media interaction; which Hendy and Wiles regarded as insufficient. The Employment Relations Authority also expedited their complaint, allowing it to proceed to the Employment Court, and ordered the university to pay their legal costs. Hendy settled with the university when he left employment there.

=== "Listener Seven" controversy ===
In late July 2021, Hendy and Wiles co-authored an open counter-letter disagreeing with seven fellow University of Auckland academics, who had penned a letter in the New Zealand Listener current affairs magazine arguing that mātauranga Māori (Māori indigenous knowledge) was incompatible with science. Hendy and Wiles contended that mātauranga Māori complemented Western knowledge systems. Their letter also asserted that the diminishing role of indigenous knowledge in science was contributed to exclusion and exploitation. Hendy and Wiles also claimed that mistrust in science was fuelled by science's role in perpetuating scientific racism, colonialism, and injustice. By 30 July, Hendy and Wiles' counter-letter had attracted more than 2,000 unverified signatures.

=== Awards and honours ===
- 2020 – Appointed a Member of the New Zealand Order of Merit, for services to science, in the 2021 New Year Honours
- 2013 – Awarded the ANZIAM E. O. Tuck Medal
- 2012 – Elected Fellow of Royal Society of New Zealand
- 2012 – Received the Prime Minister's Prize for Science Media Communication
- 2012 – Awarded the Royal Society of New Zealand Callaghan Medal
- 2010 – Received the New Zealand Association of Scientists Research Medal

== Books and selected publications ==
=== Books ===
- Hendy, Shaun; Callaghan, Paul T. (2013). Get off the Grass: Kickstarting New Zealand's Innovation Economy. Auckland, New Zealand: Auckland University Press. ISBN 978-1-86940-762-9. OCLC 851179155.
- Hendy, Shaun (2016). Silencing Science (1 ed.). Bridget Williams Books. doi:10.7810/9780947492847. ISBN 978-0-947492-84-7.
- Hendy, Shaun (2019). #NoFly Walking the Talk on Climate Change. Bridget Williams Books. ISBN 978-1-988587-05-9.

=== Selected academic publications ===
- Aref, Samin; Friggens, David; Hendy, Shaun (2018). "Analysing scientific collaborations of new zealand institutions using scopus bibliometric data". Proceedings of the Australasian Computer Science Week Multiconference on - ACSW '18. pp. 1–10. arXiv:1709.02897. doi:10.1145/3167918.3167920. ISBN 9781450354363. S2CID 3472966.
- Ridings, Kannan M.; Aldershof, Thomas S.; Hendy, Shaun C. (5 March 2019). "Surface melting and breakup of metal nanowires: Theory and molecular dynamics simulation". The Journal of Chemical Physics. 150 (9): 094705. arXiv:1812.05724. Bibcode:2019JChPh.150i4705R. doi:10.1063/1.5086435. ISSN 0021-9606. PMID 30849918. S2CID 73465180.
- Safaei, Sina; Archereau, Aurélien Y. M.; Hendy, Shaun C.; Willmott, Geoff R. (21 August 2019). "Molecular dynamics simulations of Janus nanoparticles in a fluid flow". Soft Matter. 15 (33): 6742–6752. Bibcode:2019SMat...15.6742S. doi:10.1039/C9SM00694J. hdl:2292/47904. ISSN 1744-6848. PMID 31397471. S2CID 199504254.
