= Isabel Castro =

Isabel Castro may refer to:

- Lita Baron, Spanish-born American actress and singer born as Isabel Castro
- Isabel Castro (artist), Mexican American artist
- Isabel Castro (biologist), wildlife biologist in New Zealand
- Isabel Castro (filmmaker)
- Isabel de Castro, Portuguese film actress
- Isabel Barreto de Castro, Spanish sailor and traveler, the first known woman to hold the office of admiral in European history
