= Manhire =

Manhire is a surname. Notable people with the surname include:

- Bill Manhire (born 1946), New Zealand poet and writer
- Toby Manhire, New Zealand journalist, son of Bill
