= Samuel Te Kani =

New Zealand writer and sexpert (born 1990)

Samuel Te Kani (born 1990) is a New Zealand author, artist, and sexpert.

== Early life ==
Te Kani (Ngāpuhi) grew up in Whangārei. Te Kani has described growing up in a Protestant household who were accepting of his early cross-dressing, and that his family experienced brief stints of homelessness as a result of evictions. Te Kani came out as gay when he was 14, saying that he came out "without the practical knowledge of my orientation, only the fervent theoretical belief that I was a homosexual."

== Career ==
Te Kani started sex blogging in 2013–14, which then led to series of mini-documentaries, Sex with Sam, for Vice on different aspects of sex and sexuality in New Zealand.

Te Kani has also written cultural, music, and sex-related essays for a variety of publications, including Metro, Vice, The Spinoff, TVNZ, Stuff, NZ Herald, and Radio New Zealand.

In 2015 Te Kani contributed a chapter to the book Close Your Eyes With Holy Dread, and in 2020 contributed a chapter to the exhibition catalog Whose Futures?

During the COVID-19 pandemic in New Zealand Te Kani supplemented his income by writing 150–200 personalised erotic stories on commission. Reoccurring motifs in these commissions were John Campbell, Britney Spears, and bisexual Male-Male-Female stories.

Te Kani participated in New Zealand's 2018 National Poetry Day, and in two panels in the 2020 Samesame But Different writing festival; one on science-fiction, and another on sex. Te Kani participated in the 2022 Auckland Writers Festival and 2022 New Zealand Young Writers Festival.

In 2022, Te Kani's essay Catholic Taste was shown and orated in the art show Season, a mixed-medium gallery in the Commercial Bay Shopping Centre. In 2022 Te Kani and Johanna Cosgrove started a podcast Rats in the Gutter where they discuss art and pop culture.

=== Please, Call Me Jesus ===
In 2021 Te Kani published Please, Call Me Jesus his debut fiction book of erotic short-stories. In describing the book, Te Kani said that Please, Call Me Jesus is "a collection of mostly erotic fiction, but I play with the genre a little bit there too, so there's sci-fi and fantasy elements."

One reviewer summarised the book as "There's an unsavory Messiah, a monk named Tilda Swinton, as well as werewolves, a lidless box of dildos and enough fisting scenes to equal 11 weeks of lockdown." One review for 95bFM said that Please, Call me Jesus is "clever and dark, and it's consistently reminding you of how freaky and weird and intelligent [Te Kani]'s brain is.

=== Influence and writing style ===
Te Kani's work often falls under the science-fiction category, he said "I love sci-fi categorically as a genre because it's just a lab house for futures. It's a space where we can project and reimagine where we are and where we are going."

Te Kani said the first time he encountered erotic fiction was when he was twelve years old, reading Less Than Zero by Bret Easton Ellis, which led to a lifelong interest in the subject. Te Kani has been influenced by writers Witi Ihimaera and Peter Wells.

== Published works ==
- Te Kani, Samuel (2015). Davidson, Henry (ed.). Close your eyes with holy dread. Artspace. ISBN 978-0-99412-256-8. OCLC 929994058.
- —— (2020). Murtola, Anna-Maria; Walsh, Shannon (eds.). Whose Futures?. Economic and Social Research Aotearoa. ISBN 978-0-47354-738-7. OCLC 1236459764.
- —— (2021). Please, call me Jesus. Dead Bird Books. ISBN 978-1-99115-061-5. OCLC 1286676571.
