= Prime Minister's Science Prizes =

Science awards in New Zealand

The Prime Minister's Science Prizes are awarded yearly by the Prime Minister of New Zealand. They were first awarded in 2009 in order to raise the profile and prestige of science among New Zealanders. The 2019 awards were presented in early 2020.

== Awards ==
=== The Prime Minister's Science Prize ===
Awarded to an individual or a team, the prize recognises a scientific discovery or achievement that has a significant economic, health, social or environmental impact on New Zealand or internationally in the past five years. The total prize is NZD 500,000.

==== Prizewinners ====
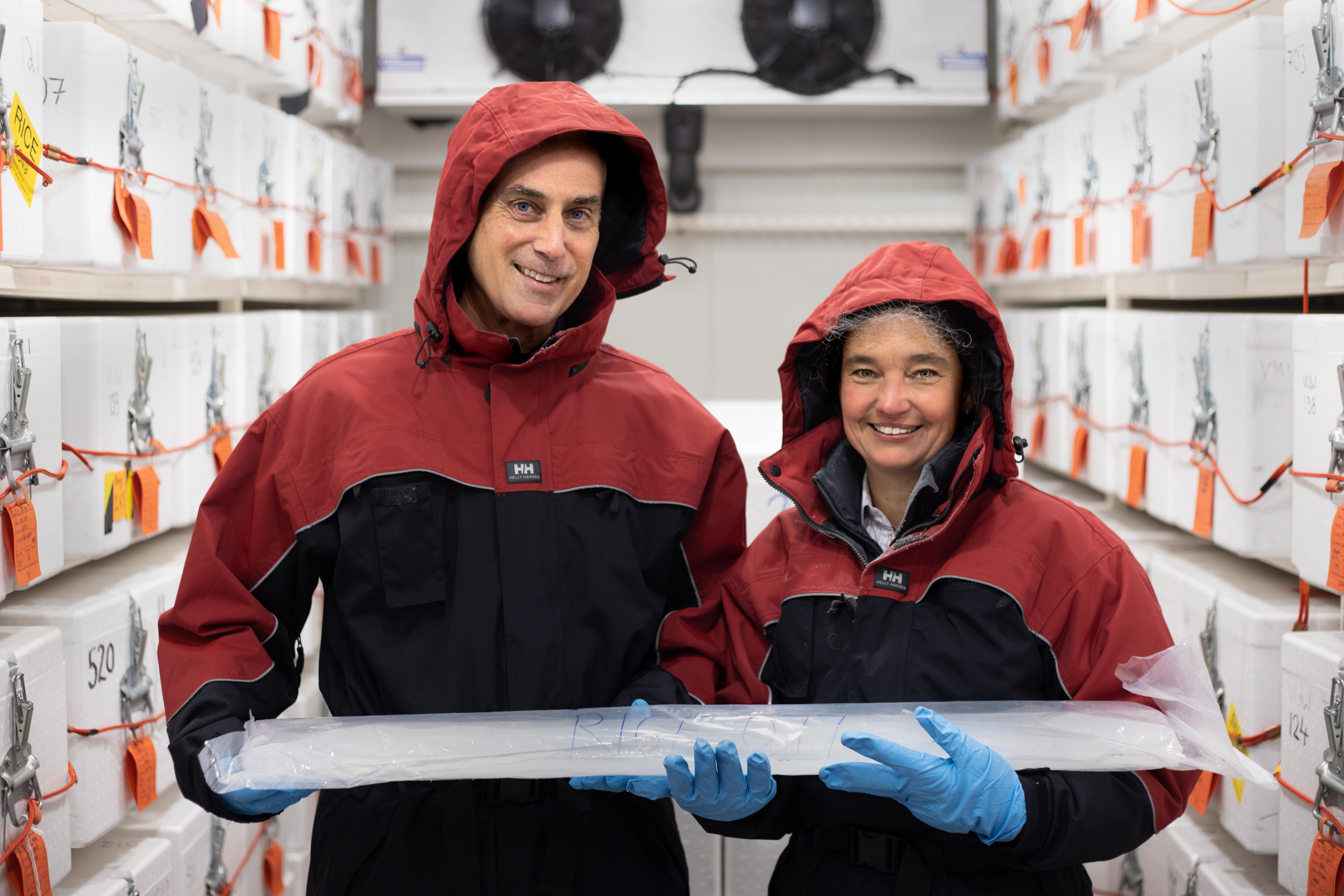
Dr Richard Levy and Dr Nancy Bertler, members of the 2019 Prime Minister's Science Prize winning team, holding an ice core

- 2023: Hereditary Diffuse Gastric Cancer Team, led by Parry Guilford from the University of Otago
- 2022: The National Institute for Stroke and Applied Neurosciences, led by Valery Feigin from Auckland University of Technology
- 2021: The Neonatal Glucose Studies Team, led by Jane Harding
- 2020: 24 research scientists doing COVID-19 modelling at Te Pūnaha Matatini
- 2019: Antarctic sea rise research by scientists at Victoria University, Niwa and GNS Science
- 2018: STRmix team of 16 software developers from Institute of Environmental Science and Research.
- 2017: Plant & Food Research Psa response team.
- 2016: The Dunedin Study led by Richie Poulton, and key team members Terrie Moffitt, Murray Thomson, Jonathan Broadbent, Avshalom Caspi, Bob Hancox, Malcolm Sears, Nigel Dickson, Jennie Connor and Joanne Baxter
- 2015: Bone and Joint Research Group, led by Mark Bolland, Andrew Grey and Ian Reid.
- 2014: He Kainga Oranga/Housing and Health Research Programme led by Professor Philippa Howden-Chapman.
- 2013: John Boys and Grant Covic at the University of Auckland.
- 2012: Paul Moughan and Harjinder Singh at Massey University.
- 2011: NIWA – Otago University Chemical and Physical Oceanography team led by Philip Boyd.
- 2010: Magnetic Resonance Innovation team led by Paul Callaghan.
- 2009: Bob Buckley and Jeff Tallon of Industrial Research Ltd.

=== The Prime Minister's MacDiarmid Emerging Scientist Prize ===
The prize is awarded to an outstanding emerging scientist who has had their PhD conferred within the last eight years. Prior to 2015 the qualifying period was within five years of conferment. The recipient receives NZD 200,000. This award was preceded by Young Scientist of the Year sponsored by the MacDiarmid Institute.

==== Prizewinners ====
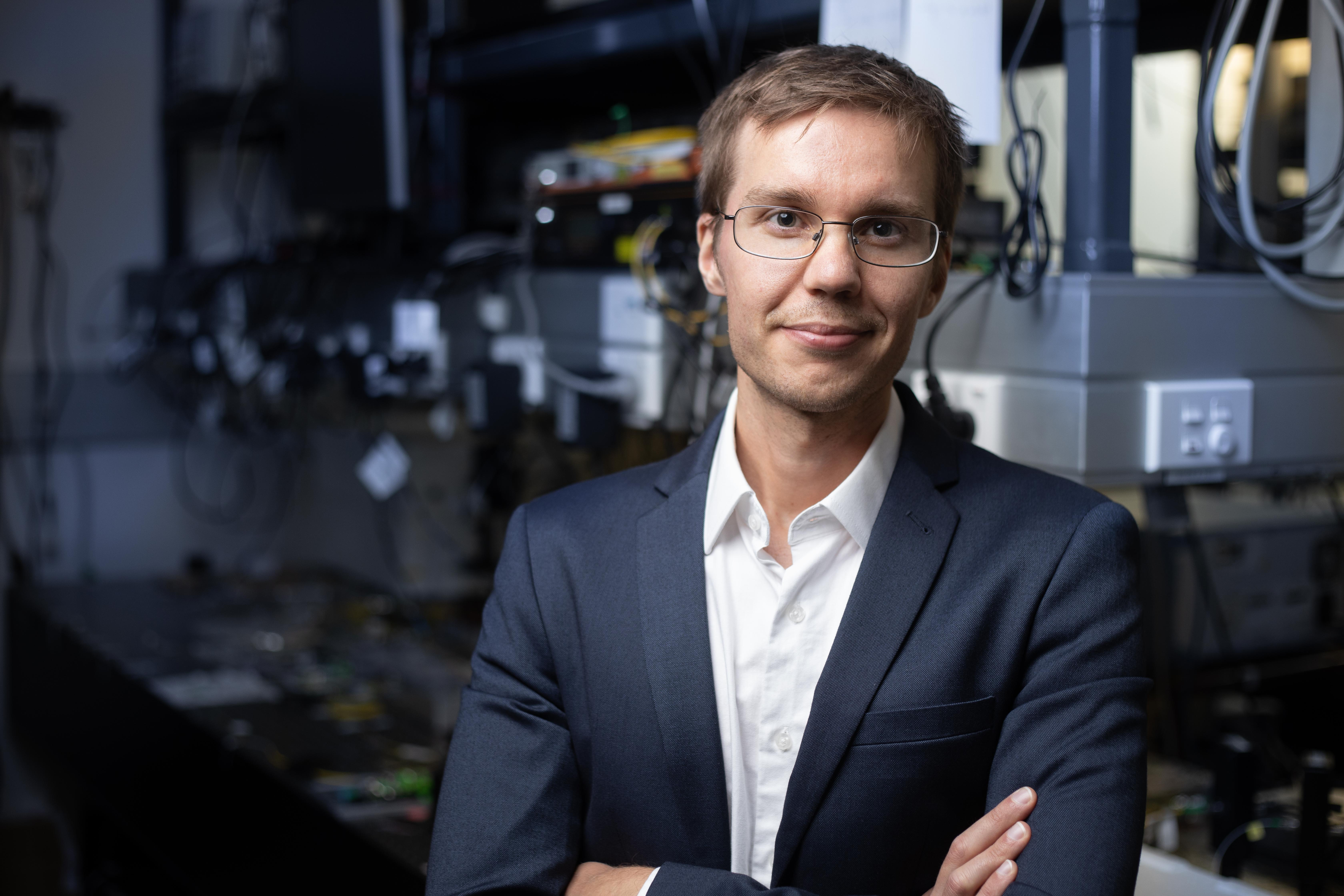
Dr Miro Erkintalo in his lab at the University of Auckland

- 2023: Samuel Mehr from the University of Auckland
- 2022: Jonathan Tonkin from the University of Canterbury
- 2021: Jemma Geoghegan from the University of Otago
- 2020: Chris Cornwall from Victoria University of Wellington
- 2019: Miro Erkintalo from the University of Auckland
- 2018: Peng Du from the University of Auckland
- 2017: Carla Meledandri from the University of Otago
- 2016: Brendon Bradley from the University of Canterbury
- 2015: Alex Taylor from the University of Auckland
- 2014: Karl Iremonger from the University of Otago
- 2013: Benjamin O’Brien of StretchSense Ltd
- 2012: James Russell from the University of Auckland
- 2011: Rob McKay from Victoria University of Wellington
- 2010: Donna Rose Addis from the University of Auckland
- 2009: John Watt from Victoria University of Wellington

=== The Prime Minister's Science Teacher Prize ===
Awarded to a teacher who is teaching science to school-age children, the prize is NZD 150,000.

==== Prizewinners ====
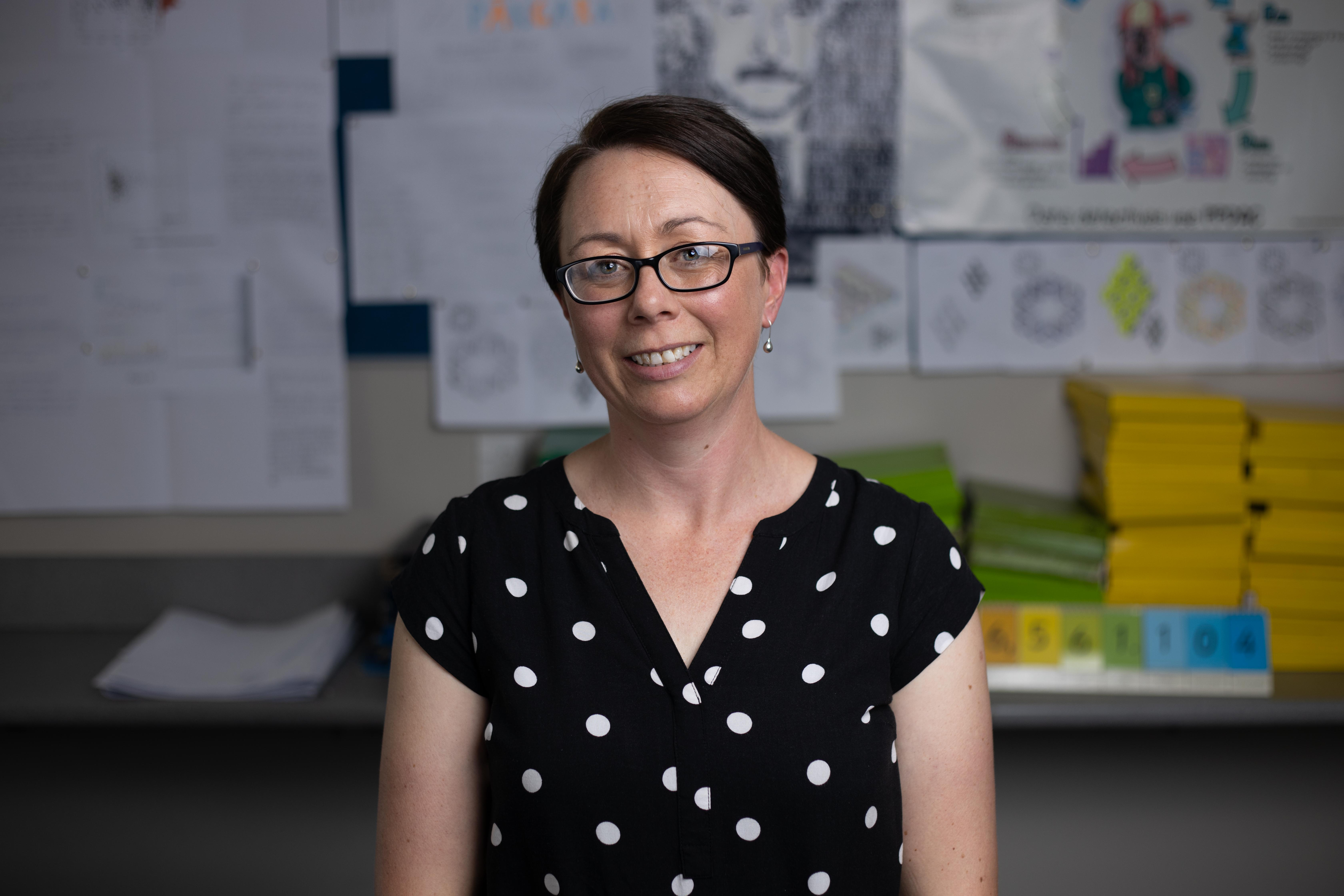
Dr Michelle Dalrymple from Cashmere High School, Christchurch, won the 2019 Prime Minister's Science Teacher Prize

- 2023: Madeleine Collins, from Green Bay High School, Auckland
- 2022: Douglas Walker, from St Patrick's College in Wellington
- 2021: Bianca Woyak, from Burnside Primary School in Christchurch
- 2020: Sarah Washbrooke from Remarkables Primary School, Queenstown
- 2019: Michelle Dalrymple from Cashmere High School
- 2017: Sarah Johns from Nelson College for Girls.
- 2016: Diana Christenson from Koraunui School, Lower Hutt.
- 2015: Tania Lineham, Head of Science at James Hargest College, Invercargill.
- 2014: Terry Burrell, Learning Area Leader of Science at Onslow College, Wellington.
- 2013: Fenella Colyer of Manurewa High School in Auckland.
- 2012: Peter Stewart, Papatoetoe High School, Auckland.
- 2011: Angela Sharples, Rotorua Boys’ High School.
- 2010: Steve Martin from Howick College in Auckland.
- 2009: Paul Lowe at Morrinsville College in Waikato.

=== The Prime Minister's Future Scientist Prize ===
Awarded to a Year 12 or Year 13 student who has undertaken a science, mathematics, technological or engineering project, the prize is worth NZD 50,000.

==== Prizewinners ====
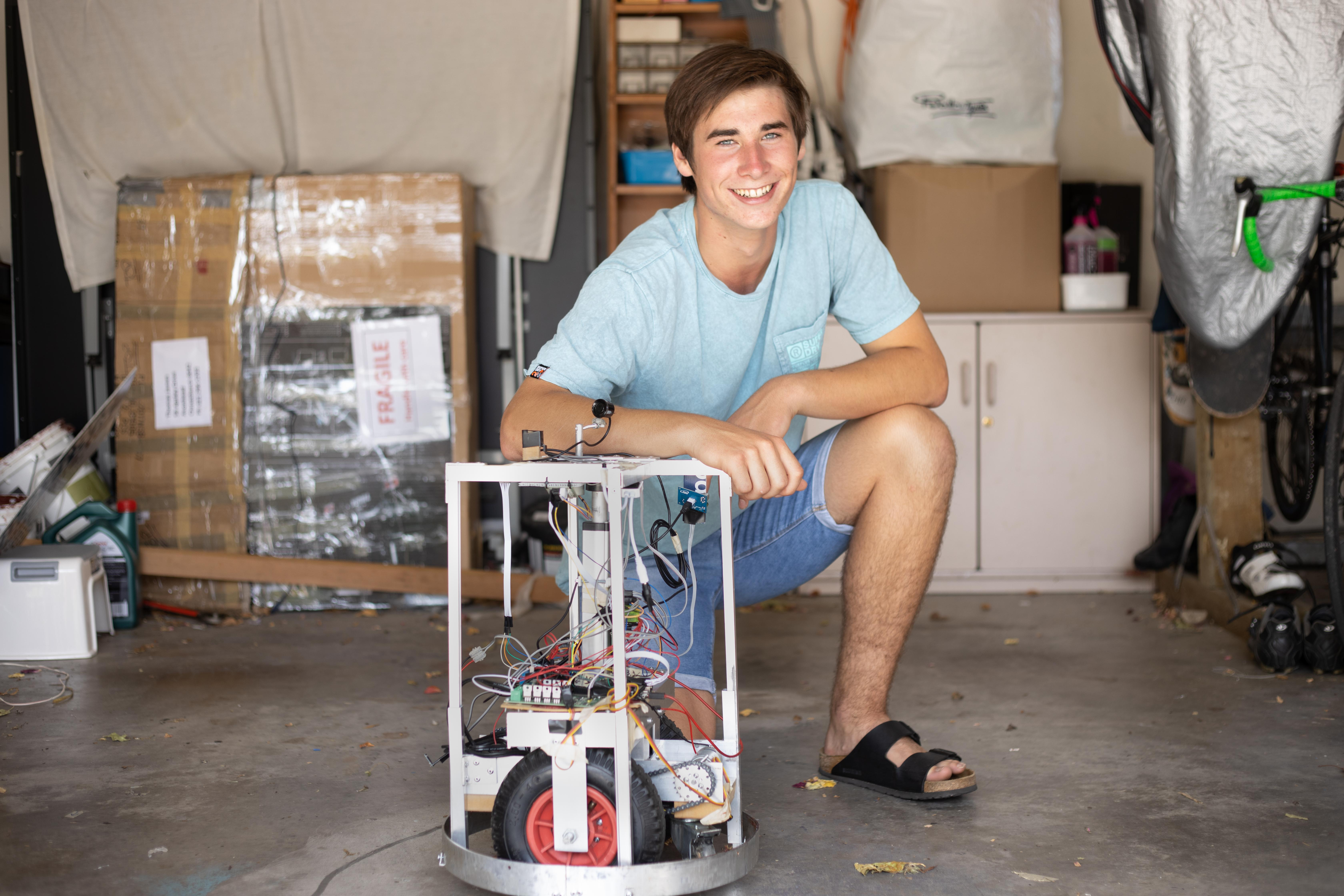
Thomas James, winner of the 2019 Prime Minister's Future Scientist Award with his winning robotic device

- 2023: Sunny Perry from Kerikeri High School in Northland
- 2022: Benjamin Smith from Onslow College in Wellington
- 2021: Carol Khor Shun Ting from Burnside High School, Christchurch
- 2020: James Zingel from Bethlehem College, Tauranga
- 2019: Thomas James from Burnside High School
- 2018: Finnegan Messerli from Onslow College, Wellington.
- 2017: Jonathan Chan, Auckland Grammar School.
- 2016: Catherine Pot from Onslow College, Wellington.
- 2015: Georgia Lala from Diocesan School for Girls, Auckland.
- 2014: Tim Logan from Darfield High School, Canterbury.
- 2013: Thomas Morgan at Marlborough Boys’ College in Blenheim.
- 2012: Hannah Ng, St Cuthbert’s College, Auckland.
- 2011: Nuan-Ting Huang, Diocesan School for Girls, Auckland.
- 2010: Bailey Lovett at James Hargest College, Invercargill.
- 2009: Stanley Roache, Onslow College, Wellington.

=== The Prime Minister's Science Communication Prize ===
The Prize is awarded to either a practising science with an interest, passion and aptitude for science communication, or to a person with expertise in communicating complex scientific or technological information to the public. The prize was worth NZD 100,000. In 2021 the prize was worth $75,000.

==== Prizewinners ====
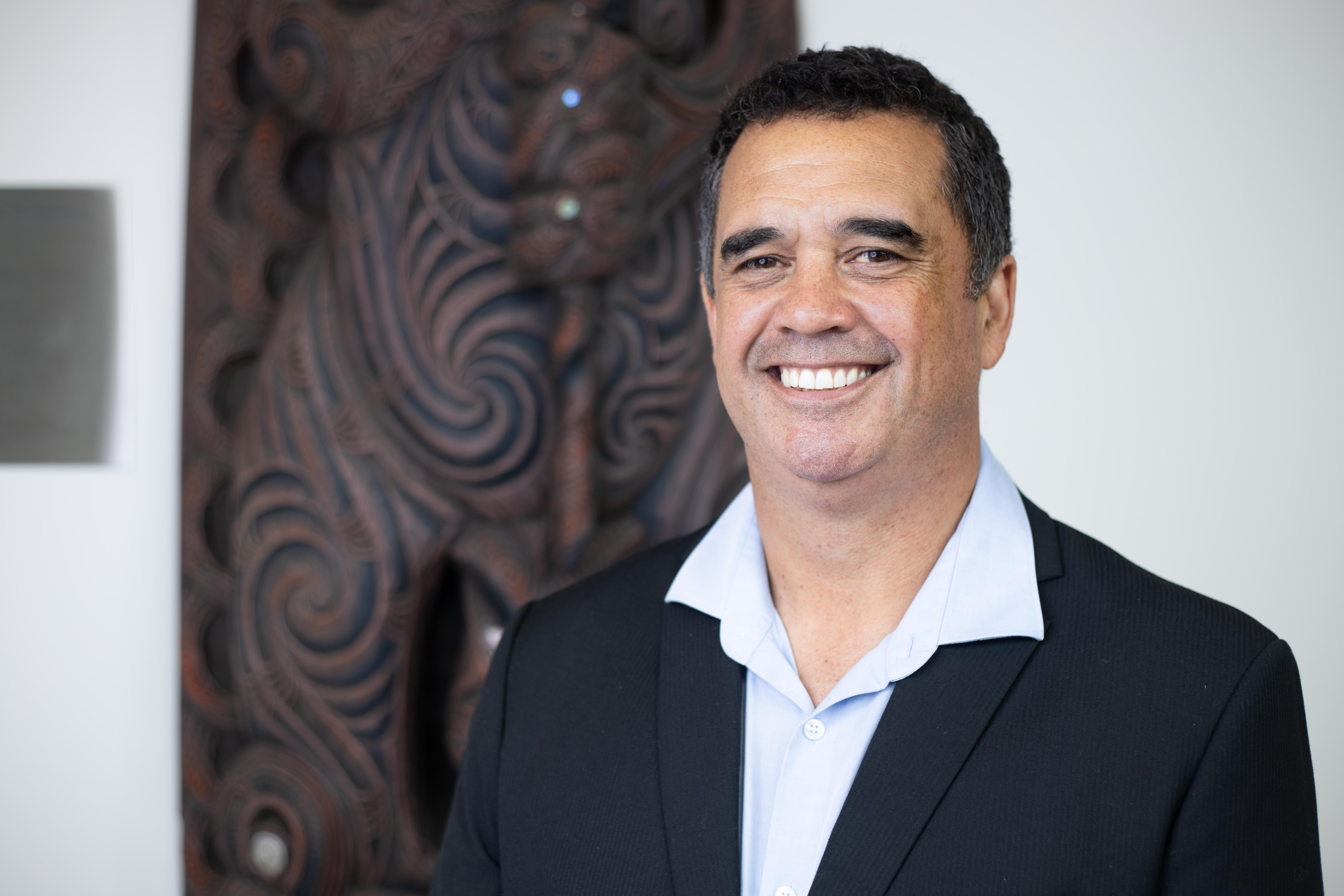
Rangi Matamua won the 2019 Prime Minister Science Communication Prize for his work in raising awareness about Matariki

- 2023: Ben Kennedy, University of Canterbury
- 2022: Dianne Sika-Paotonu, University of Otago
- 2021: Toby Morris, cartoonist, the Spinoff
- 2020: Michael Baker, University of Otago
- 2019: Rangi Matamua, University of Waikato
- 2018: James Renwick, Victoria University of Wellington
- 2017: Damian Christie, SciFilms.
- 2016: Rebecca Priestley from Victoria University of Wellington.
- 2015: Ian Griffin at the Otago Museum.
- 2014: Michelle Dickinson, 'Nanogirl', at the University of Auckland.
- 2013: Siouxsie Wiles, University of Auckland.
- 2012: Shaun Hendy, Victoria University of Wellington and Industrial Research Ltd.
- 2011: Mark Quigley, University of Canterbury.
- 2010: Cornel de Ronde at GNS Science.
- 2009: Elizabeth Connor, Wellington.
