= Ilze Ziedins =

New Zealand statistician

Ilze Brigita Ziedins is a New Zealand statistician whose research concerns the queueing theory of stochastic networks, and the use of this theory to model problems in health care, communications, transportation, and climate change. She is an associate professor of statistics at the University of Auckland.

== Education and career ==
Ziedins is the daughter of Rudolfs Ziedins (1924–2012), a philosopher from Latvia who became a professor at the University of Waikato. She went to university at Waikato, and then travelled to the University of Cambridge in England for doctoral study, completing her PhD in 1989. Her dissertation, Stochastic Models of Traffic in Star and Line Networks, was supervised by Frank Kelly.

After holding a research fellowship in Girton College, Cambridge and a lecturer position at Heriot-Watt University in England, Ziedins joined the academic staff of Auckland University in 1993.

== Recognition ==
Ziedins is a Fellow of the New Zealand Mathematical Society. As a member of Te Pūnaha Matatini, a centre of excellence for complex systems at the University of Auckland coordinating research on the coronavirus pandemic, she is a joint recipient of the 2020 Prime Minister's Science Prizes.
