= Onslow College =

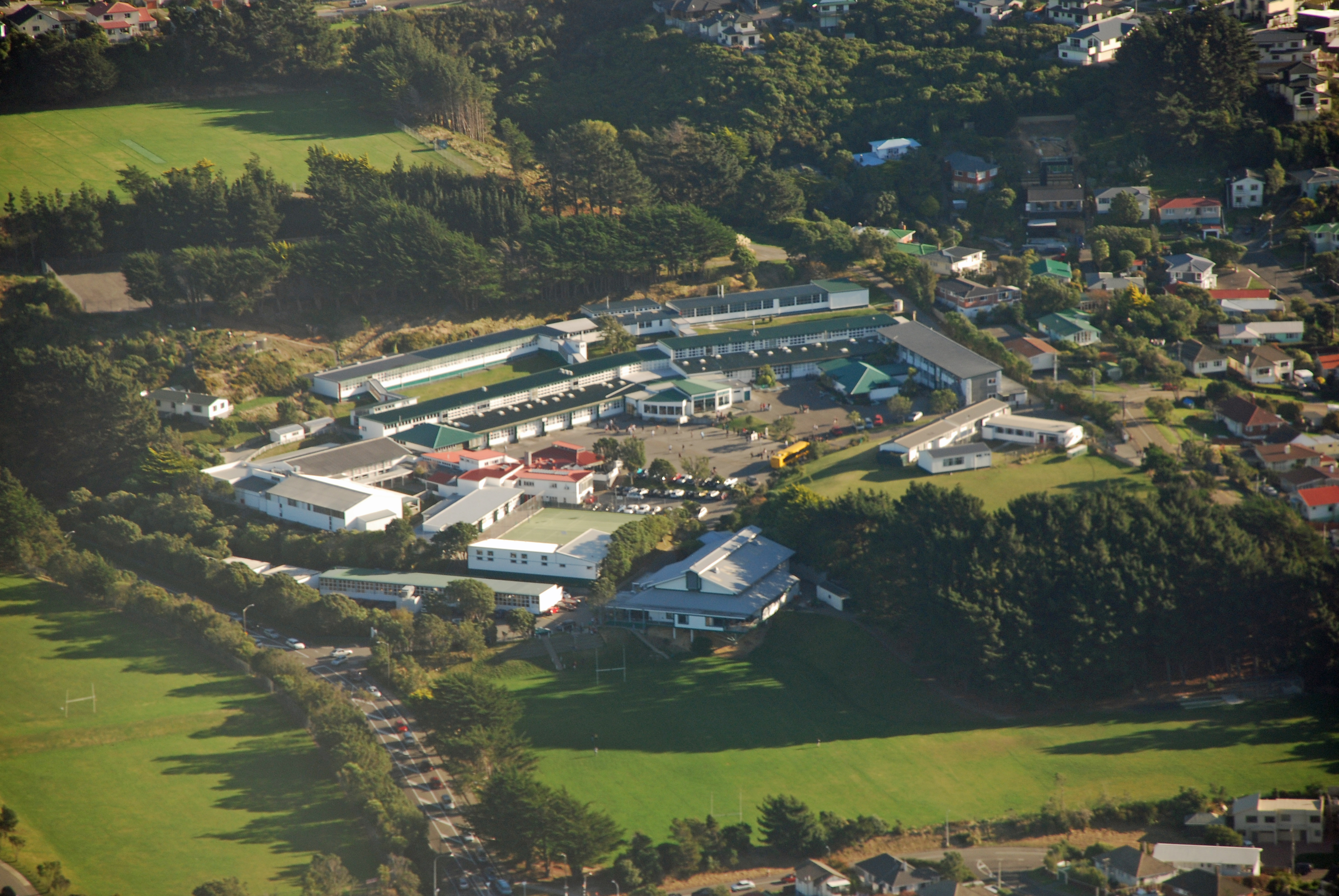
- Onslow College and surrounds

Location
- Burma Road; Johnsonville; Wellington 6440; New Zealand; 41°13′51″S 174°47′49″E

Information
- Type: State co-ed secondary; years 9–13
- Motto: Latin: Levavi oculos meos in montes Māori: Ka anga atu aku kanohi ki nga maunga Lift your eyes to the hills
- Established: 1956; 70 years ago
- Ministry of Education Institution no.: 269
- Principal: Mr Jonathan Wyeth
- Enrolment: 1,187 (July 2026)
- Socio-economic decile: 10Z
- Website: onslow.school.nz

Onslow College is a state co-educational secondary school located in Johnsonville, a suburb of Wellington, New Zealand. In 2022 it had 1405 students. The current principal is Jonathan Wyeth.

== History ==
Onslow College opened in 1956 to serve Wellington's rapidly growing northern suburbs. It was named after the 4th Earl of Onslow, governor of New Zealand from 1889 to 1892.

The school roll grew from 201 third form pupils in 1956 to 1180 pupils in 1969.

Former principal Stuart Martin described the "Onslow Way" as "socially liberal but educationally conservative, decile 10 but physically run down". In 1969, Peggy-Anne Wendelken became New Zealand's first woman chair of a school board of governors; at this time Onslow's board had student representation, twenty years before this became a legal requirement.

The school has not had a school uniform since 1974 when it was abolished following student protest, despite the strong opposition of the Headmaster. In 2016 Onslow was one of the first schools in the region to have gender-neutral toilets for students.

Several staff have received awards for teaching excellence. Terry Burrell, received the prestigious Prime Minister's Science Teacher Prize in 2014, and the same year Esme Danielsen (Maths) received a Woolf Fisher Fellowship.

Onslow students won The Prime Minister's Future Scientist Prize in 2009, 2016 and 2018.

Music – Smokefree Rockquest Wellington regional finalists in 2021 were Obsidian Sun. In 2016 Onslow College bands and individuals took out five of the eight awards the Regional Final: Best Vocalist – Raquel Abolins-Reid, Musicianship Award – Noah Spargo, Best Lyricist – Sarah Mc Bride, 3rd placed band – Bird on a Wire, 1st placed band and overall winners of the Wellington Regional Final – Retrospect.

In 2017 Onslow College won the Wellington regional "Festival Cup" for the school best representing the spirit of the Big Sing, a school choral festival organised by the New Zealand Choral Federation.

== Controversies ==
On 13 February 1997, 18-year-old former student Nicholas Hawker murdered 15-year-old St Mary's College student Vanessa Woodman on the school's grounds. Hawker was sentenced to life imprisonment with a 10-year non-parole period. He was released on parole in 2015, but is not allowed in the North Island.

In 2021, Onslow College teacher Derek Neal pinched a female student's bottom and said she had a "nice bottom" while the two took a photo during a school event dinner. During a subsequent Teaching Council's Disciplinary Tribunal Neal admitted to his actions and attempted to defend them by saying the student "threw herself at him". The tribunal censored him for serious misconduct. The English and media studies teacher was said by students to have had a history of making sexual comments in class.

In May 2025, Onslow College deputy principal Connor Baird was put on leave while both the Teaching Council and the New Zealand Police investigated serious misconduct allegations. Baird voluntarily agreed not to teach while the matter was being investigated. According to an email sent to caregivers, “Onslow College is currently undertaking a process that ensures the matter is managed respectfully and fairly".

== School Buildings ==
On Friday 25 October 2024 the school received an engineering report on two of the school's blocks stating they were earthquake prone. The first building listed was the O block which was discovered to have a New Building Standard (NBS) rating of 30%, with an inner stairwell having a rating of 15% and the building having a 6% inter-story drift between floors. The second building listed was the Gym (Block Q) which has an NBS rating of 15% with the celling braces posing the greatest risk. As a result of the low NBS rating on these two buildings the school has made the decision for the two buildings to be closed until further notice.

In February 2025 Onslow College made a media release through The Post calling out the government for underinvestment. Onslow College has had buildings considered end of life for over a decade, the school has had four design phases but the Ministry of Education has not committed to any funding for the 27 new and replacement classrooms. This is despite promises by then Education Minister Chris Hipkins.

== Principals ==
The school has had the following principals:

- 2025–present Jonathan Wyeth
- 2018–2025 Sheena Millar
- 2010–2018 Peter Leggat
- 2009–2009 Hamish Davidson (acting)
- 2001–2009 Dr Stuart Martin
- 1998–2000 Peter Smith
- 1994–1998 John Carlyon
- 1987–1993 Neale Pitches
- 1979–1986 Bill Officer
- 1977–1979 Harvey Rees-Thomas
- 1966–1977 Dudley Hughes
- 1956–1965 Colin Watt

== Notable alumni ==
=== Academia ===
- James Belich – professor of history and writer

=== The arts ===
- Jackie van Beek – film and television director, writer and actor
- John McDougall – guitarist-songwriter (The Holidaymakers)
- Fazerdaze (Amelia Rahayu Murray) – singer-songwriter
- Kate Camp – poet and author
- Nick Bollinger – musician (Rough Justice, Windy City Strugglers), music critic and author
- Peter Marshall – singer (The Holidaymakers)
- Rosemary McLeod – writer
- Sue Wootton – author
- Taika Waititi – film director and actor. Academy award winner.
- Leon Wadham – actor, writer and director
- Riiki Reid – singer-songwriter
- Ben Schrader – urban historian

=== Broadcasting and journalism ===
- Ian Wishart – editor Investigate magazine
- Rocky Wood – non-fiction author and freelance journalist

=== Politics ===
- Catherine Delahunty – Green Party MP
- Georgina Beyer – the world's first transgender mayor and later member of parliament.
- Tāmati Coffey – Former TVNZ Breakfast weather presenter; Labour Party MP (2017–2023)
- Trevor Mallard – former Labour Party MP and Speaker Of The House
- Sandra Lee-Vercoe – first Maori woman to win a general seat in Parliament
- Sara Templeton – local body politician.
- Ben McNulty – deputy mayor of Wellington

=== Sport ===
- Alan Isaac – International Cricket Council President
- Gavin Larsen – New Zealand cricket player
- Jeremy Coney – New Zealand cricket player
- Joe Wright – New Zealand Olympic Rower 2015
- Noah Billingsley – New Zealand football player
- Richard Ussher – New Zealand multisport athlete & World AR champion 2005/2006

== Notable staff ==
- Jeremy Coney – New Zealand cricket player
- Penny Kinsella – New Zealand cricket player
- Tina Manker – German Olympic rower
