= Sciblogs.co.nz =

Sciblogs.co.nz was a network of New Zealand based science bloggers. The network was founded in late 2009 and included a collection of scientists from universities, Crown Research Institutes and private research organisations.

Sciblogs.co.nz was established in September 2009 by the Science Media Centre (NZ) funded by the Ministry of Research, Science & Technology (MoRST) through the Royal Society of New Zealand. It was based on the WordPress platform. Around half of the blogs were syndicated from existing science bloggers, the rest were hosted exclusively on Sciblogs. Sciblogs content was syndicated on Google News and Scoop.co.nz as well as on Facebook and Twitter.

The site was one of the largest blog networks in New Zealand.

In August 2015, Sciblogs was redeveloped and relaunched with a more visual appearance and improved functionality, as well as the addition of new bloggers covering everything from psychology to drones.

Sciblogs was decommissioned in August 2022. An archived copy of all the blogs on SciBlogs] (no longer updated) can be found via the National Library of New Zealand.

Selected bloggers on sciblogs.co.nz (Links no longer work but individual blog copies can be found via the National Library's archive above):
Author	Blog name	Topic	Original / Syndicated	Link
Ken Perrott	Open Parachute	critical thinking	Syndicated	http://sciblogs.co.nz/open-parachute/
Gareth Renowden	Hot Topic	climate change	Syndicated	http://sciblogs.co.nz/hot-topic/
Alison Campbell	BioBlog	biology	Syndicated	http://sciblogs.co.nz/bioblog/
Grant Jacobs	Code for life	Bioinformatics	Original	http://sciblogs.co.nz/code-for-life/
Peter Griffin	Visibly shaken	data visualisation		http://sciblogs.co.nz/visibly-shaken/
Anna Sandiford	Forensic Scientist	Forensic Science		http://sciblogs.co.nz/forensic-scientist/
Guest bloggers	Guest Work	Guest bloggers	science	http://sciblogs.co.nz/guestwork/
Shaun Hendy	A Measure of Science	innovation	Original	http://sciblogs.co.nz/a-measure-of-science/
Darcy Cowan	Skepticon	Skeptics	Syndicated	http://sciblogs.co.nz/skepticon/
Brendan Moyle	Chthonic Wildlife Ramblings	Wildlife	Syndicated	http://sciblogs.co.nz/chthonic-wildlife-ramblings/
Aimee Whitcroft	misc.ience	science	Original	http://sciblogs.co.nz/misc-ience/
Bryan Walker	Hot Topic	Climate Change		http://sciblogs.co.nz/hot-topic/
David Winter	the atavism	evolution	Syndicated	http://sciblogs.co.nz/the-atavism/
Peter Griffin	Griffin's Gadgets	technology	Original	http://sciblogs.co.nz/griffins-gadgets/
Daniel Collins	Waiology	Hydrology and limnology	Original	http://sciblogs.co.nz/waiology/
Will Hayward	The Psychologizer	Psychology	Syndicated	http://sciblogs.co.nz/thepsychologizer/
Barbara Breen-Bollard	Vantage Point	UAVs	Original	http://sciblogs.co.nz/vantagepoint/
Mark Hanna	Honest Universe	health	Syndicated	http://sciblogs.co.nz/honestuniverse/
John Pickering	Kidney-Punch	health	Syndicated	http://sciblogs.co.nz/kidney-punch/
Robert Hickson	Ariadne	futurism	Original	http://sciblogs.co.nz/ariadne/
Siouxsie Wiles	Infectious Thoughts	science	Original	http://sciblogs.co.nz/infectious-thoughts/
Karyn O'Keeffe	Sleep on it	sleep	Original	http://sciblogs.co.nz/sleep-on-it/
Wayne Linklater	Political	ecology	Original	http://sciblogs.co.nz/politecol/
Various	Infrequently Asked Questions		Original	http://sciblogs.co.nz/infrequently-asked-questions/
Steve Pointing	Pointing @ Science	science	Syndicated	http://sciblogs.co.nz/pointing-at-science/
Kimberley Collins	Up and Atom	science communication	Original	http://sciblogs.co.nz/up-and-atom/
Michelle Dickinson	Nanogirl	nanotechnology	Syndicated	http://sciblogs.co.nz/nanogirl/
Various	Public Health Expert	public health	Syndicated	http://sciblogs.co.nz/public-health-expert/
Various	The Dismal Science	economics	Syndicated	http://sciblogs.co.nz/the-dismal-science/
Christine Jasoni	The Nervy Nomad	neuroscience	Original	http://sciblogs.co.nz/the-nervy-nomad/
Marcus Wilson	Physics Stop	physics	syndicated	http://sciblogs.co.nz/physics-stop/
Helen Petousis-Harris	Diplomatic Immunity	Vaccines	Original	https://sciblogs.co.nz/diplomaticimmunity/
