= Carla Meledandri =

New Zealand chemistry academic

- Education: Dublin City University
- Awards: Prime Minister’s MacDiarmid Emerging Scientist Prize
- Scientific career
- Fields: nanoparticles
- Workplaces: University of Otago
- Thesis: NMR studies of membrane-bound nanoparticles and nanoparticle assemblies (2009)

Carla J. Meledandri is a New Zealand chemistry academic, and in 2020 was promoted to Associate Professor at the University of Otago.

== Academic career ==
After a 2009 PhD titled 'NMR studies of membrane-bound nanoparticles and nanoparticle assemblies' at the Dublin City University, Meledandri moved to the University of Otago, rising to full professor.

The American-born, Irish-educated Meledandri won the 2017 Prime Minister’s MacDiarmid Emerging Scientist Prize, which came with $200,000 in prize money.

Meledandri's work on nanoparticles includes applications in dental health and energy storage.

== Selected works ==
- Corr, Serena A., Stephen J. Byrne, Renata Tekoriute, Carla J. Meledandri, Dermot F. Brougham, Marina Lynch, Christian Kerskens, Laurence O'Dwyer, and Yurii K. Gun'ko. "Linear assemblies of magnetic nanoparticles as MRI contrast agents." Journal of the American Chemical Society 130, no. 13 (2008): 4214–4215.
- Porter, Gemma C., Donald R. Schwass, Geoffrey R. Tompkins, Sharan KR Bobbala, Natalie J. Medlicott, and Carla J. Meledandri. "AgNP/Alginate Nanocomposite hydrogel for antimicrobial and antibiofilm applications." Carbohydrate Polymers 251 (2021): 117017.
- Meledandri, Carla J., Jacek K. Stolarczyk, Swapankumar Ghosh, and Dermot F. Brougham. "Nonaqueous magnetic nanoparticle suspensions with controlled particle size and nuclear magnetic resonance properties." Langmuir 24, no. 24 (2008): 14159–14165.
- Meledandri, Carla J., Jacek K. Stolarczyk, and Dermot F. Brougham. "Hierarchical gold-decorated magnetic nanoparticle clusters with controlled size." ACS nano 5, no. 3 (2011): 1747–1755.
- Corr, Serena A., Yurii K. Gun’ko, Renata Tekoriute, Carla J. Meledandri, and Dermot F. Brougham. "Poly (sodium-4-styrene) sulfonate− iron oxide nanocomposite dispersions with controlled magnetic resonance properties." The Journal of Physical Chemistry C 112, no. 35 (2008): 13324–13327.
