= Toby Morris =

Toby Morris may refer to:

- Toby Morris (politician)
- Toby Morris (cartoonist)
