= David Hayman (disease ecologist) =

New Zealand epizootic epidemiologist

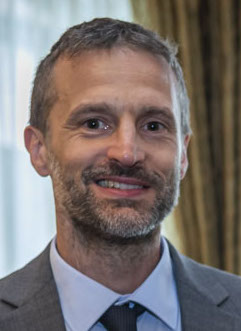
- Hayman in November 2020
- Born: David Thomas Stuart Hayman
- Education: University of Cambridge
- Known for: Research on bat-borne zoonoses and their spill-over to humans
- Scientific career
- Fields: Disease ecology, epizootiology
- Workplaces: Massey University
- Thesis: (2011)
- Website: Personal website

David Thomas Stuart Hayman is a New Zealand–based disease ecologist and epizootic epidemiologist whose work links wildlife ecology, public health and conservation biology. Best known for elucidating how viruses persist in bat populations and occasionally infect humans, he has advised the World Health Organization (WHO) and served on the One Health High‑Level Expert Panel. Hayman is Professor of Infectious Disease Ecology at Massey University and a Principal Investigator at Te Pūnaha Matatini.

== Early life and education ==
Hayman studied veterinary medicine at the University of Edinburgh, graduating BVetMed&Surg in 2002. He went on to earn an MSc in Conservation Biology from the University of Kent (2005) and a PhD in Veterinary Science from the University of Cambridge (2011), where his thesis examined viral infections in African fruit bats. Post‑doctoral training in infectious‑disease biology followed at Colorado State University.

== Academic and research career ==
After several years combining mixed veterinary practice in the United Kingdom with wildlife work in the tropics, Hayman joined Massey University in 2014 as Professor of Infectious Disease Ecology. He co‑directs the Molecular Epidemiology and Public Health Laboratory (mEpiLab), part of an OIE Collaborating Centre, and leads the university's Infectious Disease Research Centre. His group uses field studies, serology, modelling and genomics to understand when, where and why viruses emerge from wildlife reservoirs.

Much of Hayman's early scholarship showed that straw‑coloured fruit bats (Eidolon helvum) maintain henipaviruses and Lagos bat virus in small, isolated colonies, challenging assumptions that acutely immunising viruses cannot persist in limited hosts. A frequently cited 2013 comparative analysis demonstrated that, relative to rodents, bats harbour a disproportionately high diversity of zoonotic viruses, a finding linked to their unique life‑history traits.

Hayman's subsequent work broadened to the interfaces among environmental change, bat ecology and spill‑over risk. A Royal Society paper in 2012 laid out a framework for studying zoonotic emergence that integrates pathogen dynamics with socio‑ecological drivers. Later studies connected land‑use change, agricultural intensification and the "livestock revolution" with heightened coronavirus transmission risk from horseshoe bats. In commentary pieces he argues that safeguarding biodiversity can act as a form of "vaccination" against future pandemics.

Hayman is an advocate of the One Health approach, stressing that disease prevention requires policies that consider human, animal and environmental health together. He co‑authored the 2020 IPBES workshop report on biodiversity and pandemics, and, in 2021, was appointed to the WHO‑convened One Health High‑Level Expert Panel.

== Role during the COVID‑19 pandemic ==
Throughout the COVID‑19 crisis Hayman was a regular commentator in New Zealand media, explaining viral origins, transmission dynamics and control measures. He served as a member of the WHO molecular‑epidemiology team investigating the origins of SARS‑CoV‑2, contributing to the 2021 joint report that highlighted bats and pangolins as the likely reservoirs. In interviews he emphasised vaccination and continued public‑health vigilance as key to managing the disease.

== Honours and awards ==
In 2017 Hayman received a Rutherford Discovery Fellowship for a five‑year programme on multi‑scale approaches to pathogen emergence. He became a diplomate of the European College of Zoological Medicine in 2014, and in 2020 was named the Manawatū Standard "Person of the Year" for his science communication during the pandemic.

== Selected publications ==
- Hayman D.T.S. "Bats as Viral Reservoirs." Annual Review of Virology 3 (2016): 77–99.
- Peel A.J. et al. "Henipavirus Neutralising Antibodies in an Isolated Island Population of African Fruit Bats." PLOS ONE 7 (2012).
- Luis A.D., Hayman D.T.S. et al. "A Comparison of Bats and Rodents as Reservoirs of Zoonotic Viruses." Proceedings of the Royal Society B 280 (2013).
- Rulli M.C. et al. "Land‑use Change and the Livestock Revolution Increase the Risk of Zoonotic Coronavirus Transmission from Rhinolophid Bats." Nature Food 2 (2021): 409–416.
