= Sarah Washbrooke =

New Zealand teacher

Sarah Washbrooke is a New Zealand primary school teacher best known for winning the 2019 Technology Education New Zealand (TENZ) ‘Outstanding Technology Teacher Award’ and the 2020 Prime Minister's Science Teacher Prize.

Originally from the UK, Washbrooke completed an Industrial Design & Technology with Education degree at Loughborough University in 1997 and now in teaches technology at Remarkables Primary School in Queenstown, New Zealand. they are involved with Technology Education New Zealand (TENZ).

Washbrooke serves as an accessor for MBIE's Unlocking Curious Minds Contestable Fund.
