= Priscilla Wehi =

New Zealand ethnobiologist

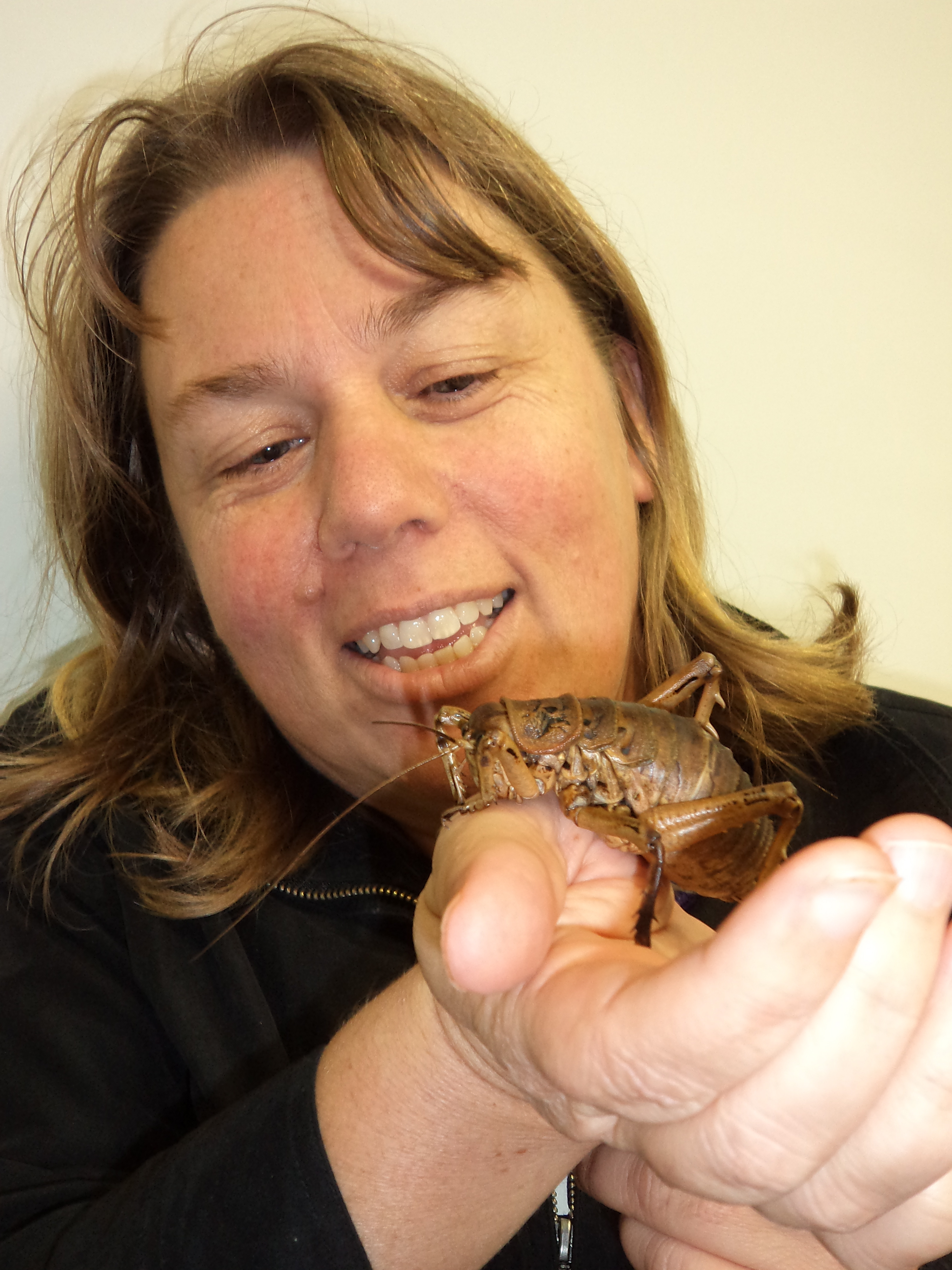
- Wehi and a wētā in 2012
- Education: University of Canterbury (B.Sc. (Hons), (B.A.)); Lincoln University (M.Sc.); University of Waikato (PhD)
- Awards: Rutherford Discovery Fellowship 2014
- Scientific career
- Fields: Ethnobiology; Conservation biology
- Workplaces: Te Pūnaha Matatini; University of Otago; Landcare Research
- Thesis: Harakeke (Phormium tenax) ecology and historical management by Maori: The changing landscape in New Zealand (2005)
- Doctoral advisor: Winifred Heather Crombie; Bruce Clarkson; Aroha Yates-Smith
- Website: priscillawehi.com

Priscilla M. Wehi (née McAllum) is a New Zealand ethnobiologist and conservation biologist. As at July 2021 she was an associate professor at the University of Otago and on the first of that month officially undertook the role of director of Te Pūnaha Matatini, a centre of research excellence in complex systems and data analytics. During the COVID-19 pandemic in New Zealand Te Pūnaha Matatini scientists developed mathematical models of the spread of the virus across the country that influenced the New Zealand government's response to the outbreak. In 2021 Wehi was awarded the Hill Tinsley Medal.

== Education ==
Wehi has a master's degree from Lincoln University, where she studied brushtail possums. She undertook her PhD at the University of Waikato's School of Māori and Pacific Development. Her doctoral thesis was entitled Harakeke (Phormium tenax) ecology and historical management by Maori: The changing landscape in New Zealand.

== Career ==
After completing her PhD Wehi obtained positions at several research institutions including at Massey University (working with Mary Morgan-Richards) and the University of Otago. She was then employed at Manaaki Whenua Landcare Research where she undertook research into wētā, and advocated for the use of indigenous knowledge to inform research into biodiversity. Wehi also led a team of researchers at Manaaki Whenua Landcare Research and Te Rūnanga o Ngāi Tahu investigating Māori exploration of Antarctic waters. Their research suggested that Māori were possibly the first people to sight the continent of Antarctica. As at July 2021, Wehi is an associate professor at the University of Otago.

== Awards ==
In 2014 Wehi was granted a Royal Society Te Apārangi Rutherford Discovery Fellowship. In 2019 Wehi was a recipient of the Outstanding Publication on New Zealand Ecology award, conferred by the New Zealand Ecological Society. In 2020 the biological sciences department of the University of Canterbury awarded Wehi their Inspirational Alumna Award. In 2021 Wehi was awarded the Hill Tinsley Medal with the New Zealand Association of Scientists recognising Wehi's "pioneering innovative research at the intersection of science and indigenous knowledge". In 2026 Wehi was elected a Fellow of the British Ecological Society.

== Selected publications ==
- Wehi, Priscilla; William L Wehi (2009). "Traditional plant harvesting in contemporary fragmented and urban landscapes". Conservation Biology. 24 (2): 594–604. doi:10.1111/j.1523-1739.2009.01376.x. PMID 19961510. Wikidata Q30954240.
- Wehi, Priscilla; Whaanga, Hēmi; Steve A Trewick (2012). "Artefacts, biology and bias in museum collection research". Molecular Ecology. 21 (13): 3103–3109. doi:10.1111/j.1365-294x.2012.05589.x. PMID 22916347. Wikidata Q34391852.
- Wehi, Priscilla; Raubenheimer, David; Morgan, Mary (2013). "Tolerance for nutrient imbalance in an intermittently feeding herbivorous cricket, the Wellington tree weta". PLOS One. 8 (12) e84641. Bibcode:2013PLoSO...884641W. doi:10.1371/journal.pone.0084641. PMC 3866171. PMID 24358369. Wikidata Q35073358.
- Jacob, Staffan; Wehi, Priscilla; Clobert, Jean; Legrand, Delphine; Schtickzelle, Nicolas; Michele Huet; Alexis Chaine (2016). "Cooperation-mediated plasticity in dispersal and colonization". Evolution. 70 (10): 2336–2345. doi:10.1111/evo.13028. PMID 27480245. Wikidata Q36091951.
- Wehi, Priscilla; Cox, Murray Paul; Roa, Thomas Charles; Whaanga, Hēmi (2018). "Human Perceptions of Megafaunal Extinction Events Revealed by Linguistic Analysis of Indigenous Oral Traditions". Human Ecology. 46 (4): 461–470. doi:10.1007/s10745-018-0004-0. PMC 6133014. PMID 30237652. Wikidata Q91600025.
- Wehi, Priscilla; Nigel J. Scott; Beckwith, Jacinta; Pryor, Rata; Gillies, Tasman; Vincent Van Uitregt; Krushil Watene (2021). "A short scan of Māori journeys to Antarctica". Journal of the Royal Society of New Zealand: 1–12. doi:10.1080/03036758.2021.1917633. Wikidata Q107185697.
- Wehi, Priscilla; Karyne M. Rogers; Tim Jowett; Sabadel, Amandine (2022). "Interpreting past trophic ecology of a threatened alpine parrot, kea Nestor notabilis, from museum specimens". Journal of Animal Ecology. 92 (2): 273–284. doi:10.1111/1365-2656.13742. PMID 35569094. Wikidata Q124838663.
