= Centre of Research Excellence =

Type of collaborative research centre in New Zealand

The Centres of Research Excellence (CoREs) are interorganisational research networks in New Zealand funded through the Centres of Research Excellence scheme, which is administered by the Tertiary Education Commission (TEC).

== History ==
The scheme was set up in 2002 with the aim "to build networks to connect high-performing researchers in the university system". A 2001 review of university research by TEC had revealed a fragmented research system, which did not encourage collaboration and was based on the number of students enrolled or on a small and short term agreed programme of research, and could not be applied strategically to fund areas of importance to New Zealand's development. The CoRE fund and the Performance Based Research Fund were set up as complementary funds to address these problems. The CoREs were intended to be networks of "high-performing researchers" that would be "strategically focused and linked to New Zealand’s future economic and societal needs, of excellent quality, and transferable."

The initial funding round distributed $260 million, with a further capital investment of $50 million, from 2001/02 to 2011/12. The initial centres were established in 2002, after a selection process run by the Royal Society Te Apārangi.

Five CoREs were selected in 2002, with another two chosen in a second round in 2003. These seven CoREs were allocated funding for six years. There was a mid-term review after three years, with funding for the remaining three years to be confirmed on the basis of an assessment of performance to date. An assessment by the Ministry of Education in 2013 concluded that "the work of the CoREs has had wide-ranging impacts on New Zealand's society and economy".

Four further contestable funding rounds have been run, in 2006/07, 2013/14, 2014/15 and 2019/20. There are currently (as of 2023) ten CoREs, which are funded until 31 December 2028. The fund is $49.8 million per annum (GST exclusive).

In 2022 another national centre of excellence was established, He Whenua Taurikura, New Zealand’s National Centre of Research Excellence for Preventing and Countering Violent Extremism. (This centre does not appear to be funded by the CoRE fund but has been included in the table below for completeness.)

== List of Centres of Research Excellence ==
Name	Host	Director(s)	Start	End	Funding	Website
Bioprotection Aotearoa (previously Bio-Protection Research Centre)	Lincoln University	Amanda Black and Travis Glare (previously Alison Stewart)	2002/03	2028	$31.5M over 8 years (2003–2010)	website
Ngā Pae o te Māramatanga – New Zealand’s Māori Centre of Research Excellence	University of Auckland	Linda Smith and Michael Walker	2002/03	2028	$34.5M over 9 years (2002–2010)	website
The Maurice Wilkins Centre for Molecular Biodiscovery	University of Auckland	Greg Cook (previously Ted Baker)	2002/03	2028	$33.4M over 9 years (2002–2010)	website
MacDiarmid Institute for Advanced Materials and Nanotechnology	Victoria University of Wellington	Nicola Gaston (initially Paul Callaghan)	2002/03	2028	$13.39M over 3 years and a one-off $9.8M capital grant	website
Allan Wilson Centre for Molecular Ecology and Evolution	Massey University	David Penny and Mike Hendy	2002/03	2015	$26.8M over 9 years (2002–2010)	
Gravida: National Research Centre for Growth and Development	University of Auckland	Philip Baker (previously Peter Gluckman)	2002/03	2015		
New Zealand Institute of Mathematics and its Applications	University of Auckland	Vaughan Jones and Marston Conder	2002/03	2008	$4.855M over 3 years and a one-off $113,970 capital grant	
Dodd-Walls Centre for Photonic and Quantum Technologies, Te Whai Ao	University of Otago	David Hutchinson	2014/15	2028		website
Healthy Hearts for Aotearoa New Zealand – Pūtahi Mānawa	University of Auckland	Anna Rolleston and Julian Paton	2020	2028		website
Coastal People: Southern Skies	University of Otago	Chris Hepburn and Anne-Marie Jackson	2020	2028		website
Te Hiranga Rū QuakeCoRE: Aotearoa New Zealand Centre for Earthquake Resilience	University of Canterbury	Brendon Bradley	2014/15	2028	Second allocation: $31.5M over seven years from 2020	website
Riddet Institute (National Centre for Research Excellence in Food Science)	Massey University	Harjinder Singh	2008	2028	$11M over 3 years (2008–2010)	website
Te Pūnaha Matatini – Aotearoa New Zealand Centre of Research Excellence for Complex Systems	University of Auckland	Shaun Hendy, Priscilla Wehi, Markus Luczak-Roesch,	2013	2028		website
Medical Technologies	University of Auckland	Diana Siew and Peter Hunter		2021		website
Brain Research New Zealand	University of Auckland and University of Otago			2021		
He Whenua Taurikura, National Centre of Research Excellence for Preventing and Countering Violent Extremism	Victoria University of Wellington	Joanna Kidman and Paul Spoonley	2022		$1.325M for the year beginning 1 July 2022 and $2.15M for each subsequent year	website

== Defunded CoREs ==
Two centres that were funded in 2002/03 failed to get further funding after 2015:

- Allan Wilson Centre for Molecular Ecology and Evolution, hosted by Massey University.
- Gravida: National Research Centre for Growth and Development, hosted by the University of Auckland

Two others were funded until mid-2021:

- Brain Research New Zealand (BRNZ), co-hosted by the University of Auckland and the University of Otago
- Medical Technologies, hosted by the University of Auckland

The New Zealand Institute of Mathematics and its Applications was funded for six years from 2002.

== See also ==
- Cooperative Research Centres (Australia)
- Center of excellence
