= Motu Economic and Public Policy Research =

New Zealand research institute

- Formation: September 2000; 26 years ago
- Type: Think tank
- Location: Wellington, New Zealand
- Executive Director: John McDermott
- Website: www.motu.nz

Motu Economic and Public Policy Research is an economic and public policy research institute based in Wellington, New Zealand.

== History ==
Founded in September 2000 on the model of non-political US research institutes funded by grants and donations, the initial trustees were Dr Grant Scobie, Sir Geoffrey Palmer and Dr Ann Sullivan. The institute's goal is to be fully independent, with no expressed ideology or political position. A registered charitable trust, contract funding comes from, various sources including government departments and private companies, and they also receive additional, non-contract funding by way of endowments and donations from public and private institutions and individuals via the associated Motu Research and Education Foundation.

Motu is the top economics organisation in New Zealand according to RePEc and was the top climate think tank in Oceania in 2015 according to the International Center for Climate Governance.

Research reports have included such areas as innovation and productivity, climate change, emissions trading, well-being, and housing affordability. In January 2022 it produced an assessment of the New Zealand government's Families Package.

It hosts the Human Rights Measurement Initiative established in 2016.
