= Samuel Mehr =

American cognitive scientist

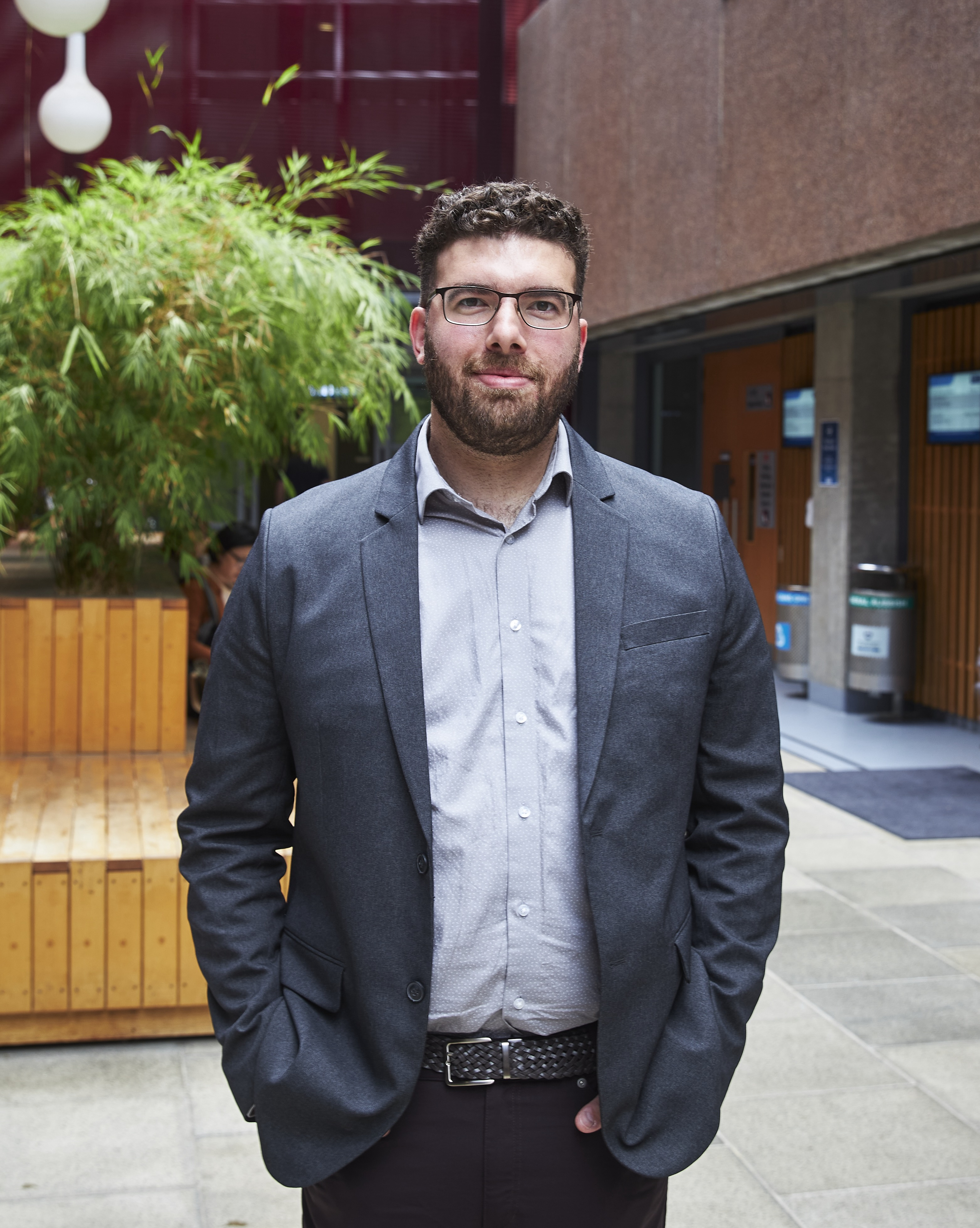
- Education: University of Rochester; Harvard University
- Occupation: Senior Lecturer in Psychology
- Scientific career
- Fields: Cognitive Psychology; Developmental Psychology; Data Science
- Workplaces: University Auckland; Yale University

Samuel Mehr is a New Zealand cognitive scientist specialising in auditory perception, developmental psychology, cross-cultural research, and data science. He is based at the University of Auckland and the Yale Child Study Center.

Mehr was the recipient of the New Zealand Prime Minister's MacDiarmid Emerging Scientist Prize in 2023, and the US National Institutes of Health Director's Early Independence Award in 2017, both for his work on the psychology of music.

== Academic career ==
Mehr attended the Eastman School of Music at the University of Rochester, where he received a Bachelor of Music in Music Education in 2010. Mehr completed his Ed.D. in Human Development and Education from Harvard University in 2017 under the mentorship of Howard Gardner, Steven Pinker, and Elizabeth Spelke. After completing his doctorate, he continued as a Faculty Research Associate at Harvard, where he continued his research into music cognition and developmental psychology.

Mehr has served as a Lecturer at Victoria University of Wellington and is currently an Associate Professor Adjunct at Yale University Child Study Center and a Senior Lecturer in the School of Psychology at the University of Auckland where he leads a lab focused on exploring the intersections of music, culture, and cognitive development.

=== Research areas ===
Mehr's research is primarily focused on the psychological and evolutionary underpinnings of music. He has conducted extensive studies on how and why music is a universal phenomenon across cultures. One area of his research involved assembling archival recordings from 319 societies from around the world to create a database titled The Natural History of Song. Examining 5,000 songs, Mehr and colleagues examined that several forms of song, namely love songs, dance songs, lullabies, and songs of healing clustered together along three primary dimensions related to each song's respective formality, arousal, and religiosity. Mehr and colleagues also experimentally showed that individual listeners carry assess these songs along similar dimensions in both WEIRD and non-WEIRD societies.

Mehr also showed that vocal signatures of infant-directed care, such as lullabies and baby talk are expressed cross-culturally across the globe in both industrialized and non-industrialized societies and carry similar properties regardless of location. He argues that the evolution of such signals may have been reflected in the context of an evolutionary arms race resulting from parent-offspring conflict.

Another key area of Mehr's research is the impact of music on child development. His work in this domain examined the role that playing music may have on infant development, finding no spillover effects of a musical education on non-musical cognitive development.
