= Wildbase Recovery =

Wildlife rehabilitation centre in Palmerston North, New Zealand

Coordinates: 40.371°S 175.617°E

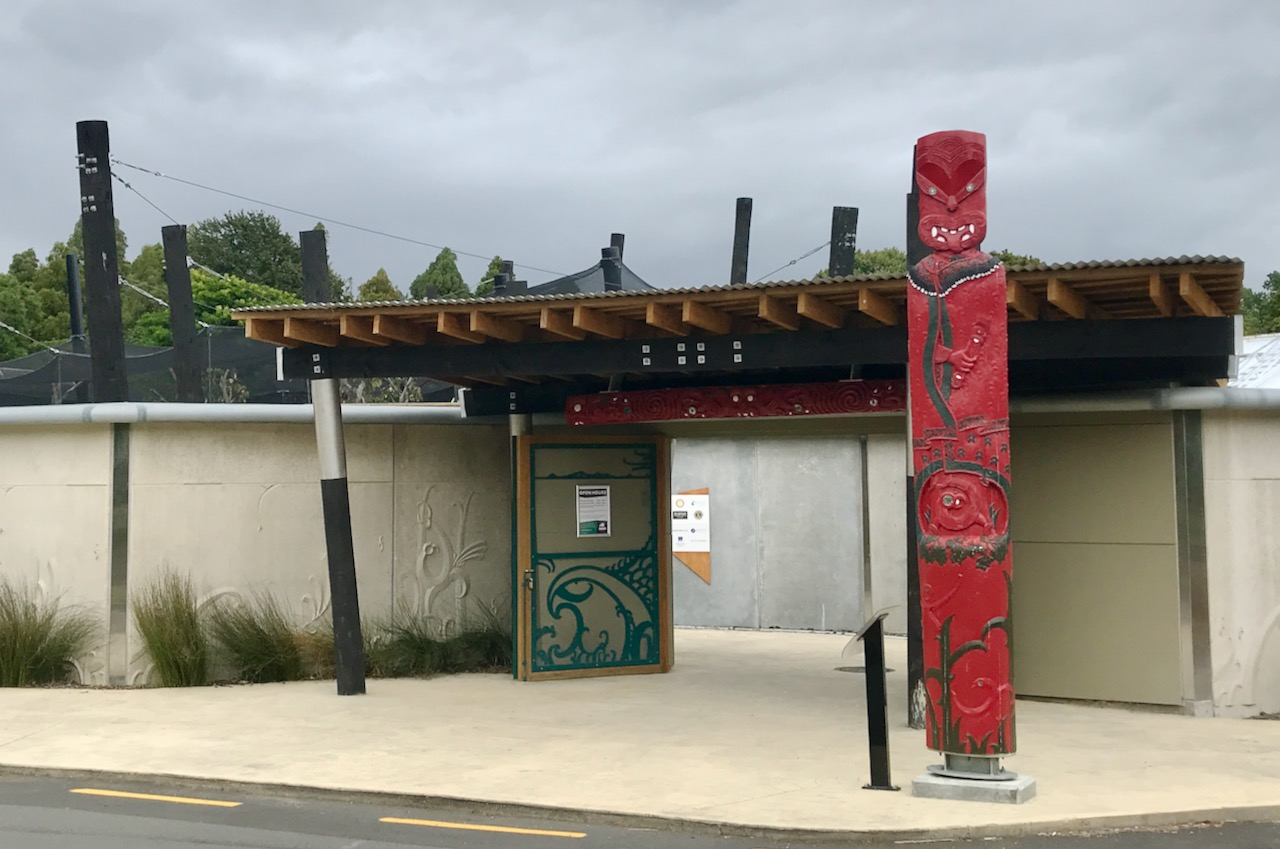
The Wildbase Recovery visitor centre in Victoria Esplanade, Palmerston North

The Central Energy Trust Wildbase Recovery centre is a New Zealand wildlife rehabilitation facility and visitor centre in Palmerston North. The centre treats injured wildlife and allows the public to watch birds and other animals recovering from treatment. The 2,900-square-metre (31,000 sq ft) complex is situated in the Victoria Esplanade and is owned by the Palmerston North City Council and co-managed with the Massey University School of Veterinary Science.

The centre was built in 2018 to provide facilities for the Massey University Wildbase team to looks after birds and other wildlife recovering after treatment at Massey University's Wildbase hospital. It includes an education centre, rehabilitation aviaries and a walk-in aviary accessible for visitors since its opening to the public in February 2019. A team of volunteers provides educational information and public tours.

Although Wildbase Recovery's main purpose is to treat injured wildlife, oversee their recovery and get them back into the natural environment rather than permanently house animals like a zoo, the centre has been popular with the public, having had more than 100,000 visitors in its first year.
