= Jennie Connor =

New Zealand medical researcher and academic

Jennie Connor ONZM
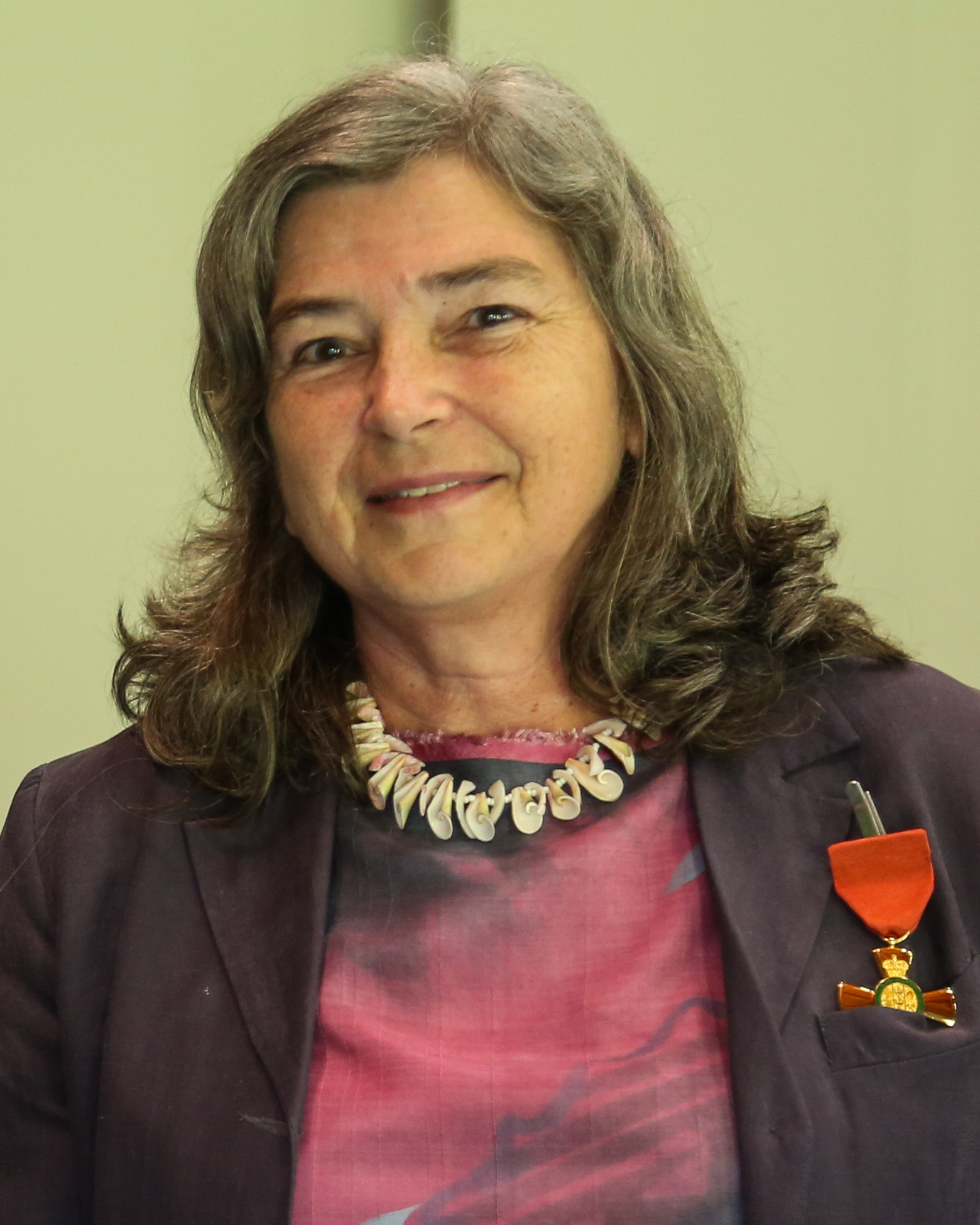
- Connor in 2023
- Born: 1958 (age 67–68)
- Education: University of Auckland
- Scientific career
- Fields: Preventive and social medicine
- Workplaces: University of Otago
- Thesis: Estimating the contribution of driver sleepiness to car crash injuries : the Auckland car crash injury study (2001)

Jennie Lynne Connor ONZM (born 1958) is a New Zealand medical researcher and academic, and as of 2018 is a full professor and chair of preventive and social medicine at the University of Otago.

== Academic career ==
After a 2001 PhD titled Estimating the contribution of driver sleepiness to car crash injuries : the Auckland car crash injury study at the University of Auckland, Connor moved to the University of Otago, rising to full professor. Much of Connor's recent research focuses on the health effects of drinking.

In the 2023 New Year Honours, Connor was appointed an Officer of the New Zealand Order of Merit, for services to alcohol harm reduction.
