= The Spinoff =

New Zealand news site

- Screenshot of The Spinoff's front page
- Website type: Online magazine
- Available in: English
- Founder: Duncan Greive
- Editor: Veronica Schmidt
- CEO: Amber Easby
- Website: thespinoff.co.nz
- Commercial: Yes
- Launched: 10 September 2014; 12 years ago

The Spinoff is an online magazine and media company based in Auckland, New Zealand. Duncan Greive founded it in September 2014 as a television blog sponsored by Lightbox, the streaming service owned by Spark New Zealand. It later expanded into politics, current affairs and culture, and publishes newsletters and podcasts alongside written articles. Greive and his wife Nicola Greive own a controlling stake in the company.

The organisation is funded by sponsored content, reader donations through a membership programme, and public media funders. Its editors have been Greive, Toby Manhire, Madeleine Chapman and Veronica Schmidt. Amber Easby is chief executive.

== History ==
=== Founding and early years (2014–2016) ===
Greive had worked as a music writer and media columnist, including for Metro and other magazines, before launching The Spinoff. The site went live on 10 September 2014 with Lightbox as its only sponsor and television as its only subject. Lightbox had launched the previous month and funded the site as a way to build interest in television among New Zealand readers. Early writers included Alex Casey, who joined as the first staff writer. The site attracted an audience in 2015 with weekly recaps of popular local reality programming. Early projects included videos by José Barbosa, and "The Side Eye", a comic series by Toby Morris.

In 2015 the company leased an office in the Britomart precinct in Central Auckland. The Spinoff relaunched on 10 September 2015, its first anniversary, with sections on sport, politics, social issues, books and parenting alongside television. New writers included Steve Braunias (books), Scotty Stevenson (sport), Toby Manhire (politics), Catherine McGregor, Calum Henderson and Hayden Donnell. Madeleine Chapman began as an intern at the end of 2015, and Sam Brooks joined soon after. Its first podcasts, including the politics show Gone By Lunchtime and the pop culture show The Real Pod, began in 2016.

=== Growth and Spinoff TV (2016–2019) ===
In July 2016 The Spinoff launched The War for Auckland, a temporary section covering the controversial Auckland Unitary Plan and the October 2016 local elections. A PledgeMe campaign to fund the coverage raised NZ$24,621 from 370 donors, against a target of $10,000. It was the first time The Spinoff had taken an editorial position on an issue and the first time it had asked readers for money.

Simon Wilson, a former editor of Metro Magazine, joined as Auckland editor in early 2017. In February he hosted “The War for Mt Albert”, a debate for the Mount Albert by-election with Julie Anne Genter, Geoff Simmons and Jacinda Ardern. On 6 September 2017, before the general election, The Spinoff held the Great Debate in partnership with Facebook. Toby Manhire became politics editor in 2017 and the site also launched Ātea, a section on Māori affairs edited by Leonie Hayden.

Manhire succeeded Greive as editor in early 2018. That year the company moved to an office in Morningside, Penguin commissioned a book from the site - later released as The Spinoff Book - and Alice Neville joined as food editor. The podcast lineup included Gone By Lunchtime, The Real Pod, Business Is Boring and On the Rag. On the Rag was hosted by Michele A’Court, Hayden and Casey. Designer Tina Tiller and Morris led the site’s visual work.

In 2017 the production company Great Southern proposed that The Spinoff make a television series. Hal Crawford, Three’s head of news, supported the project, and it received NZ On Air funding. Production of the series began in March 2018.

In March 2018 the site launched The Bulletin, a morning email newsletter summarising news from across New Zealand media. It was sponsored by Vector and written by Alex Braae, a former producer at Newstalk ZB.

The Spinoff TV, a weekly half-hour programme on current affairs, pop culture and media, premiered on Three on 22 June 2018 at 9.45 pm on Fridays, after "7 Days". Casey and Hayden hosted. Segments mixed reporting, comedy and illustrations by Morris, and contributors included Tom Sainsbury, and Angella Dravid. The show’s ratings fell after its first weeks, and the network moved it to a later slot. Broadcaster Mike Hosking criticised it repeatedly. National MP Melissa Lee proposed a member’s bill that the Taxpayers’ Union called “The Spinoff TV Memorial Bill”. The series ran for 16 weeks and ended with an hour-long episode on 5 October 2018. It was not renewed.

=== Member support and COVID-19 (2019–2023) ===
In 2019 The Spinoff launched The Spinoff Members, a programme through which readers make regular donations to fund its journalism. The same year it also received funding from Creative New Zealand to commission articles on contemporary New Zealand art and artists. The art section was edited by New Zealand critics Mark Amery and Megan Dunn. In September 2019 The Spinoff published Alex Casey’s report on a Labour Party volunteer’s allegation of sexual assault by a party staffer. Coverage of the party’s handling of the complaint grew after the report, and party president Nigel Haworth resigned two days later.

Chapman left in early 2020, and Casey left the same year to work in reality television. In March 2020 the site shifted its coverage to the COVID-19 pandemic. It published rolling live updates on breaking and developing news. Later that year the site hired Justin Giovannetti as its first press gallery reporter and political editor.

During the COVID-19 pandemic, The Spinoff began working with the World Health Organization (WHO), after a WHO communications officer saw their series of widely shared COVID-19 public health illustrations. These were part of a series of pieces explaining COVID-19, in a collaboration between cartoonist Toby Morris and the microbiologist Dr Siouxsie Wiles. The Spinoff released the pair's illustrations and animations to Wikimedia Commons, where they have been picked up by public health services around the world.

In April 2020 Bauer Media closed its New Zealand magazines, including the Listener and Metro. Greive said the number of paying members tripled in the following weeks. The company had claimed the government wage subsidy and returned it less than a month later. By April 2021 the site had 10,000 paying members. Greive said revenue had nearly doubled in the previous financial year and that the company had remained profitable. He also said it had received no outside investment.

In 2021, Greive told business journalist Tash McGill: "Our business model is partnership and sponsorship and we make it clear when our content is funded in that way. When our journalists are not writing for a partner, they are writing whatever they want. We give them implicit license because they know what makes good content and we know what our audience is interested in."

Manhire resigned as editor in 2021, and Chapman returned to succeed him. Writers she hired or promoted included Stewart Sowman-Lund, Claire Mabey and Joel MacManus.

After the World Health Organization approached The Spinoff about producing material for it, the company set up a digital agency in May 2020 with the WHO as its first client. The agency was named Daylight Creative in January 2021. The group also owned the video production company Hex Work Productions. In June 2022 Daylight Creative merged with the technology company Translate Digital to form Daylight. The merged company had 28 staff, more than The Spinoff, and shared its Morningside offices.

In 2022, The Spinoff also increased its senior staff, and it made losses that year. Greive later said his worst decision was hiring too quickly during the pandemic-era economy, which he described as temporary, and that reversing it was painful.

=== Job losses (2023-present) ===
Greive stepped down as chief executive in early 2023. Amber Easby became chief executive. She had produced the series "Get It to Te Papa’’ and led the company’s video division, whose series included "Bad News’’, "Scratched’’ and "Youth Wings’’. Greive took the title of founder and remained chair of the boards of The Spinoff and Daylight. He also hosted the media podcast The Fold. That year Greive described the site’s audience as relatively young, urban and principled, and said this was its primary attraction for advertisers. Nielsen measured a unique audience of 412,000 in October 2024. The New Zealand Herald said much of the site’s opinion writing was widely considered left of centre.

In 2024 Easby merged the company’s audio and video departments into its editorial team. Anna Rawhiti-Connell, a former editor of The Bulletin, led the audience team, and Elisa Rivera led the commercial team. In July 2024 Sowman-Lund became editor of The Bulletin. Lyric Waiwiri-Smith, previously at Stuff and TVNZ, joined as a staff writer, and Liam Rātana joined as Ātea editor. The same year, newly-appointed Wellington editor Joel MacManus wrote The War for Wellington, a series on the Wellington district plan.

The Spinoff marked its tenth anniversary on 10 September 2024.

In November 2024 The Spinoff cut three full-time roles and one part-time role. It also froze most external commissioning and paused several newsletters. On 28 November the company published an open letter citing falling advertising revenue and reduced public funding. It set a goal of doubling its 9,080 paying members. It later reported that membership passed 13,000 within a month.

In December 2024 The Spinoff reported that Stuff's owner Sinead Boucher planned to split the company into two businesses, one for digital and one for print. In March 2025 The New Zealand Herald reported that Stuff had threatened legal action against The Spinoff over the coverage.

In November 2025, The Spinoff announced former TVNZ and RNZ manager Veronica Schmidt as its fourth editor, following Madeleine Chapman, Toby Manhire and Duncan Greive. In May 2026 Easby said falling search traffic and the loss of advertising to offshore technology companies had worsened the company’s position, and set a goal of 5000 new members by the end of the year.

== Staff and contributors ==
Some of the people whose work has appeared in The Spinoff include:

- Duncan Greive
- Toby Manhire
- Toby Morris
- Dr Siouxsie Wiles
- Madeleine Chapman
- Steve Braunias
- Finlay Macdonald
- Charlotte Grimshaw
- Ashleigh Young
- Anjum Rahman
- Michelle Langstone
- Ranginui Walker
- Kim Workman
- Debbie Ngarewa-Packer
- Metiria Turei
- Briar Grace-Smith
- Chris Tse
- Dr Shaun Hendy
- Samuel Te Kani
- Claire Mabey
- Holly Walker
