= Ann Gluckman =

New Zealand educator and writer (1927–2026)

Ann Gluckman OBE JP
- Born: Ann Jocelyn Klippel; 13 August 1927; London, England
- Died: 13 March 2026 (aged 98); Auckland, New Zealand
- Occupations: Educator; writer; historian
- Known for: First female principal of a state co-educational secondary school in New Zealand
- Spouse: Laurie Gluckman (m. 1947; died 1999)
- Children: 4
- Parents: Samuel Klippel; Augusta Manoy
- Relatives: Peter Gluckman (son)

Ann Jocelyn Gluckman OBE JP (née Klippel; 13 August 1927 – 13 March 2026) was a New Zealand educator, writer and historian. She became the first woman in the country to head a state co-educational secondary school when she was appointed principal of Ngā Tapuwae College in 1975. She was also a historian of the Auckland Jewish community, authoring and editing the Identity and Involvement book series over a 30-year span.

== Early life and education ==
Gluckman was born Ann Jocelyn Klippel in London on 13 August 1927, the first child of Samuel and Augusta Klippel (née Manoy). Her mother was the first Jewish woman to graduate from the Otago Medical School in 1922. The family moved to Sydney, Australia, where her father worked as a tie manufacturer, before emigrating to Auckland, New Zealand, in 1934.

Klippel attended St Cuthbert's College and later Epsom Girls' Grammar School, where she was named head prefect and dux in 1944. Following secondary school, she began studies at Auckland University College, majoring in botany and geology.

In 1947, Klippel married Laurie Gluckman, and the couple went on to have four children between 1949 and 1957. Her studies were interrupted when her husband, developed tuberculosis, leading her to pause her degree to care for her growing family. She later returned to university, eventually graduating with a Master of Science (MSc) degree fifteen years later.

== Career ==
=== Education ===
Gluckman's teaching career began in 1964. Shortly after completing her MSc, she was offered a part-time position teaching geography at St Cuthbert's College. The following year, she joined the staff at Epsom Girls' Grammar School, where she taught for nine years and rose through the teaching ranks. In 1971, she was awarded a teaching fellowship at the University of Auckland, where she lectured in geography and climatology. Returning to Epsom Girls' Grammar in 1972, she served as the head of liberal studies and dean of the sixth form, advocating for the inclusion of controversial subjects in the curriculum to broaden students' perspectives.

After a stint as senior mistress at Seddon High School from 1974 to 1975, Gluckman was appointed the principal of Ngā Tapuwae College (now Te Kura Māori o Ngā Tapuwae) in Māngere in 1975. Serving in the role until her retirement in 1989, she was the first woman in New Zealand to lead a state co-educational secondary school. Under her leadership, Ngā Tapuwae pioneered New Zealand's first community college model. Gluckman was an advocate for multicultural education in a school with predominantly Māori and Pasifika students; she successfully campaigned for the introduction of the Samoan language into the curriculum and campaigned against the use of corporal punishment in schools.

While at Ngā Tapuwae, Gluckman studied extramurally at Massey University, earning a Diploma in Education Administration in 1980 and a Bachelor of Arts degree in 1986.

=== Writing and historical work ===
A writer, Gluckman began contributing to the New Zealand Woman's Weekly in 1951, writing articles on education and, later, travel pieces as she toured places such as South Africa and Egypt.

Gluckman contributed to the historical documentation of New Zealand's Jewish community, by conceiving and editing the Identity and Involvement series, which chronicled the history of Auckland Jewry. The first volume was published in 1990 to coincide with the sesquicentennial of the signing of the Treaty of Waitangi and the founding of the Auckland Hebrew Congregation. A second volume, co-edited with her husband Laurie, followed in 1993. In 2020, at the age of 93, she published the third volume, Identity and Involvement III: Auckland Jewry into the 21st Century, a collection of essays from over 120 contributors.

Gluckman's other literary works include Principals of Retirement (1991), Ageing is Attitude: The New Zealand Experience (1995), and Postcards from Tukums: A Family Detective Story (co-edited with Kirsten Warner), which traced her mother's Latvian family history.

=== Community service ===
Beyond education and writing, Gluckman was active in community service. She was the first woman appointed to the Medical Ethical Committee at Auckland's Middlemore Hospital. She also contributed to inter-faith dialogue through the Council of Christians and Jews, taught courses on world religions and geography at the University of the Third Age (U3A), and was instrumental in the establishment of the early playcentre movement in Auckland in the 1950s. Gluckman was a justice of the peace (JP), being appointed to the role in 1981.

== Death and legacy ==
Gluckman died in Auckland on 13 March 2026, at the age of 98. She had been predeceased by her husband, Laurie Gluckman, a psychiatrist and medical historian, in 1999. Their son, Peter Gluckman, became a paediatrician and served as the inaugural Prime Minister's Chief Science Advisor.

== Honours ==
In the 1993 New Year Honours, Gluckman was appointed an Officer of the Order of the British Empire (OBE), for services to education and the community.

== Selected bibliography ==
- Identity and Involvement: Auckland Jewry, Past and Present (1990, editor)
- Principals of Retirement (1991, editor)
- Identity and Involvement II: Auckland Jewry, Past and Present 1840–1990 (1993, co-edited with Laurie Gluckman)
- Ageing is Attitude: The New Zealand Experience (1995, with Mary Tagg)
- Postcards from Tukums: A Family Detective Story (with Kirsten Warner)
- Identity and Involvement III: Auckland Jewry into the 21st Century (2020, editor)
