= Lynnette =

Lynette
- Gender: Feminine
- Language: English

Origin
- Origin: variant of Lynette (which developed as an Anglicized form of Welsh Eluned), probably influenced by the spelling of Lynn

Other names
- Related names: Elined, Linnet, Lunete, Linet

Lynnette, also spelled Lynette, is a feminine given name.

== People ==
- Lynette Boggs (born 1963), American politician
- Lynnette Brooky (born 1968), New Zealand golfer
- Lynette Chico (born 1971), Puerto Rican fashion model and actress
- Lynnette Cole (born 1978), Miss USA 2000
- Lynette Coleman (1964–2023), Australian Paralympic athlete
- Lynette Dawn Culver, American victim of serial killer Ted Bundy
- Lynette Curran (born 1945), Australian actress
- Lynnette Ferguson, New Zealand academic
- Lynette Fromme (born 1948), American former prisoner
- Lynette Horsburgh (born 1974), Scottish snooker player
- Lynette Lithgow (1950–2001), Trinidad and Tobago journalist
- Lynette Long, American psychologist
- Lynette Roberts (1909–1995), Welsh poet
- Lynette Sadleir (born 1963), Canadian synchronized swimmer
- Lynnette Seah (born 1957), Singaporean violinist
- Lynette Tippett, New Zealand professor of psychology
- Lynette Wallworth, Australian artist and filmmaker
- Lynette Washington (21st century), American jazz vocalist
- Lynette White (1967–1988), Welsh murder victim
- Lynette Wood, Australian diplomat
- Lynette Woodard (born 1959), retired American basketball player
- Lynette Yiadom-Boakye (born 1977), British painter and writer

== Fictional characters ==
- Lynette (Arthurian character), a woman in Arthurian legend
- Lynette Bishop, a character in the Strike Witches anime
- Lynette Guycott, a character in the graphic novel series Scott Pilgrim
- Linnet Oldknow, a character in Lucy M. Boston's Green Knowe series (1954–76)
- Lynette Pomeroy, a character in the 1982 American romantic drama film, An Officer and a Gentleman
- Lynette Scavo, a character on the American television series Desperate Housewives (2004–2012)
- Lynette Snezhevna, a character in 2020 video game Genshin Impact

== See also ==
- Linet (given name)
