= Linette =

Linette is both a given name and a surname. Notable people with the name include:

- Linette Beaumont, British actress
- Cyril Linette, French sports journalist and business executive
- Magda Linette (born 1992), Polish tennis player
- Lynette and Lyonesse, two sisters in Arthurian legend

== Origin and meaning ==
Linette or Lynette has both French and Welsh origins. It is believed to mean "image" or "idol" (from eilun/eluned in Welsh) or a "linen weaver" (in French, from linus in Latin).

== See also ==
- Lanette
- Lunete
- Lynnette
