= Linet (given name) =

Linet is a feminine given name.

== List of people with the given name ==
- Linet (born 1975), Israeli-born Turkish-Jewish singer
- Linet Arasa (born 1996), Kenyan rugby player
- Linet Kwamboka (born 1988), Kenyan computer scientist and businesswoman
- Linet Masai (born 1989), Kenyan runner
- Linet Toroitich Chebet (born 1992), Ugandan runner
- Linet Toto (born 1997), Kenyan politician

== See also ==
- Lynnette
- Line (given name)
- Martha S. Linet
