= Equal Visibility Everywhere =

American non-profit corporation

- Founded: 2010; 16 years ago
- Founder: Lynette Long
- Tax ID no.: EIN 27-1749592
- Purpose: Educational
- Headquarters: Miami Beach, FL
- Location: Miami Beach, Florida
- Origins: Washington, D.C.
- Region served: United States
- Website: equalvisibilityeverywhere.org

Equal Visibility Everywhere, also known as EVE, is a non-profit 501(c)(3) organization based in Miami, Florida. EVE was founded in 2010 by the psychologist and former college professor Lynette Long, with the mission "to achieve gender parity in the monuments, symbols, and icons, of the United States." Its ongoing projects include adding more statues of women to the National Statuary Hall Collection, creating new historical markers honoring America's female heroes, adding images of women to America's paper currency and coins, increasing the number of women honored on stamps, street names, and increasing the number of female character balloons in parades. The organization has campaigned for statues of women such as Amelia Earhart in Kansas and Harriet Tubman in Maryland.

== Women in U.S. Monuments ==
Equal Visibility Everywhere's U.S. Monuments & Memorials project covers statues, plaques, and historical markers — the overwhelming majority of which are dedicated to men. Only 7% of real statues in the U.S. recognize women. Out of 5,193 public outdoor sculptures of individuals in the United States, only 394 are of women. Additionally, only one national memorial in Washington DC honors women — The Vietnam Women's Memorial. In July 1884, the first U.S. statue of a woman, Margaret Haughery, was erected in New Orleans. The statue of Margaret depicts her seated in her office but with a child nearby suggesting the looming role as mother.

=== Put a Woman in National Statuary Hall ===
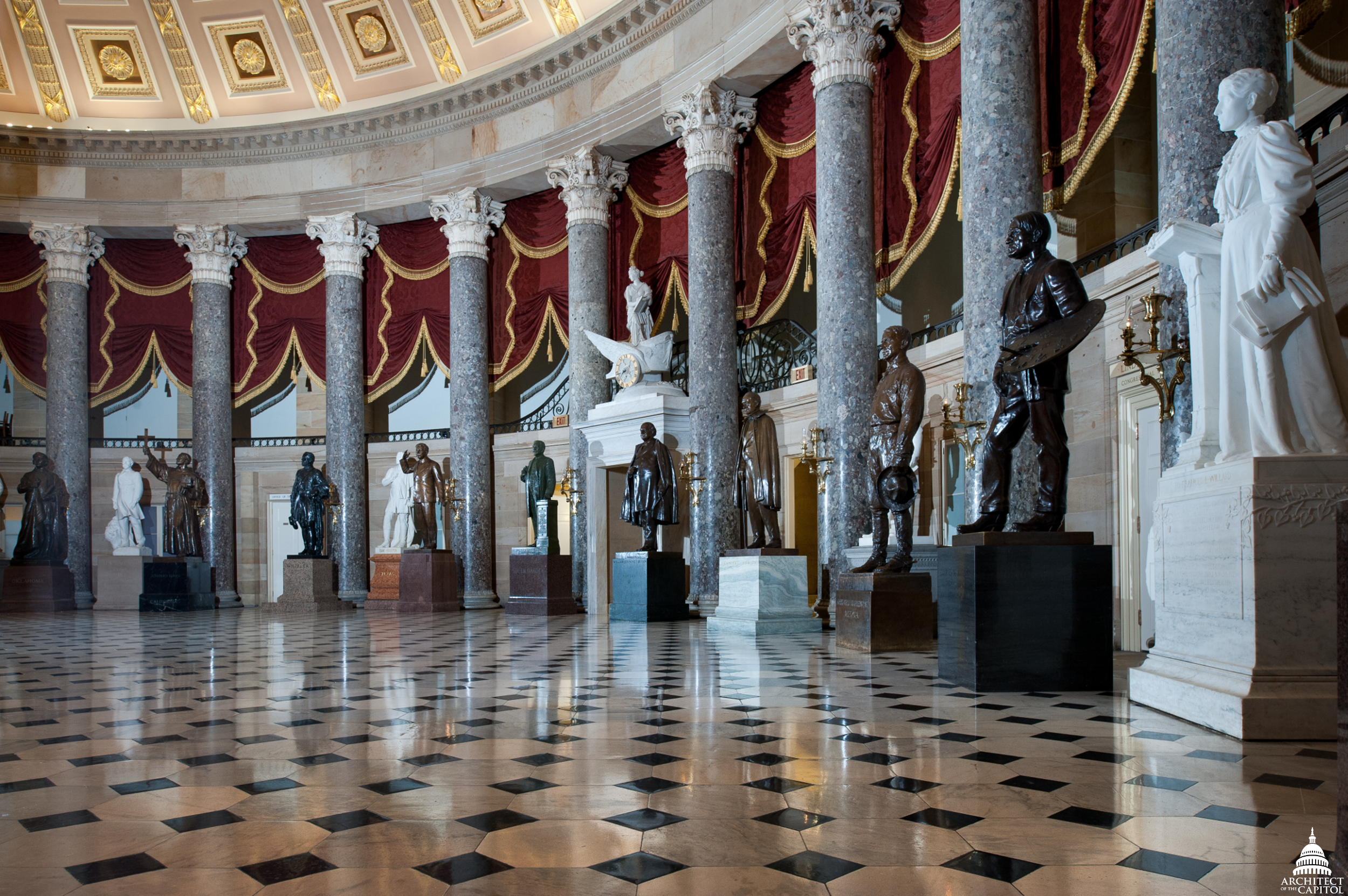
National Statuary Hall

The National Statuary Hall Collection is one of America's most prominent memorials to outstanding citizens. Located in the U.S. Capitol Building, the collection features 100 statues of distinguished Americans, two from each state. In Statuary Hall, the original House Chamber, there is only one statue of a woman out of 38 statues displayed. There are nine statues of women and ninety-one statues of men in the entire Collection which is displayed throughout the Capitol. Equal Visibility Everywhere's “Put a Woman in Statuary Hall” project is dedicated to correcting this gender representation imbalance. Currently, Equal Visibility Everywhere is leading efforts in multiple states to replace statues of men with statues of women in the National Statuary Hall Collection. Bills authorizing statues of Amelia Earhart (Kansas), Mary McLeod Bethune (Florida), Willa Cather (Nebraska), Martha Hughes Cannon (Utah) and Daisy Bates (Arkansas) have been signed into law. EVE has been actively working to add statues of First Lady Eleanor Roosevelt (New York) and Girl Scout Founder Juliette Gordon Low (Georgia).

=== Kansas's Amelia Earhart Statue ===
In 2010, EVE's founder, Lynette Long, was visiting the United States Capitol with her son Seth and noticed the disparity in the number of statues depicting men and women. She noted to the Washington Post that there were nine statues of women and ninety-one statues of men. This observation led her to form Equal Visibility Everywhere (EVE) and make one of EVE's core missions increasing the number of women represented in the National Statuary Hall Collection. Long researched the most famous women in American history, with the prospect of adding them to The Collection. While doing her research she discovered a 1999 Kansas State House Resolution which authorized that the statue of John James Ingalls be replaced with a statue of Amelia Earhart.

In 1999, the Kansas state legislature voted on a resolution to replace their state's statues of 19th-century statesmen George Washington Glick and John James Ingalls in response to a congressional bill which would allow states to replace either or both of their two statues in the National Statuary Hall Collection. One of Kansas's replacements was to be of aviation pioneer Amelia Earhart and the other Dwight D. Eisenhower. Eisenhower's statue was commissioned and placed in the National Statuary Hall Collection in 2003, but the legislation authorizing Amelia Earhart's statue was never signed by the Governor of Kansas nor by the Architect of the Capitol. Kansas's resolution named the Atchison Chamber of Commerce in charge of raising the money for the Earhart statue but the project failed to make progress and the plans were shelved.

Amelia Earhart's preliminary clay statue for the National Statuary Hall Collection.

EVE took interest in the shelved 1999 Kansas Resolution, and after acquiring appropriate authorization from the Governor and Chamber of Commerce, EVE formed the Amelia Earhart Statue Selection Committee which included the Governor of Kansas, Head of the Amelia Earhart Festival, Head of the Atchison Chamber of Commerce, a member of the Earhart Family, three prominent museum curators, and Long. Thirty-two proposals were received in response to a nationally distributed Request for Proposals. The sculptors participated in three rounds of competition with the finalists traveling to Kansas with their maquettes to make their presentations directly to the selection committee. Two of America's most prominent sculptors, George and Mark Lundeen from Loveland, Colorado were chosen to sculpt Amelia for the U.S. Capitol.

The clay statue, "Amelia", was completed and cast in bronze and approved by the U.S. Capitol. Kansas's agreement with the Capitol includes mandatory payment for the statue, its move from Colorado where it was cast to the U.S. Capitol, holding an unveiling ceremony and reception in Washington, DC and transporting the Ingalls Statue back to Kansas to an agreed upon appropriate and honorable resting place.

=== Maryland's Harriet Tubman statue ===
Equal Visibility Everywhere proposed three women to the Maryland State Legislator in 2011 to replace one of their statues with representation of a woman. The three proposed by EVE were: Clara Barton, founder of the American Red Cross, Rachel Carson, author of Silent Spring and founder of the environmental movement and abolitionist Harriet Tubman. EVE enlisted the help of Maryland NOW (the National Organization for Women) which agreed to help lobby for Harriet Tubman as the replacement statue for John Hanson.

In 2011, Maryland Senate Bill 351 and Assembly Bill 455 proposed to replace the statue of John Hanson, who served as "President of the United States in Congress Assembled" under the Articles of Confederation, with a statue of Harriet Tubman. Opposition to the statue of Harriet Tubman was led by Maryland's former Senate President, Thomas V. “Mike” Miller Jr. He was joined by two other long-standing Democrats, Senator Thomas “Mac” Middleton (descendant of John Hanson) and Senator Roy Dyson. Senator Miller went on to propose that, “a special category should be established in Statuary Hall for women and blacks who were not considered when states first were invited to contribute statues in 1864.” Linda Mahoney, former president of Maryland NOW – one of the key sponsors of the bill spoke about the roadblock to reporters, “Harriet Tubman is facing an uphill battle. John Hanson appears to have many descendants, some of them currently serving in the state legislature." The bill which proposed to make Harriet Tubman the third statue representing the state of Maryland was signed into law by Maryland Governor Martin O’Malley who then appointed a Committee in 2012 to oversee the project. Maryland's statue of Harriet Tubman would have been the first statue of an African American to be added into The Collection. The first sculpture to honor a black woman in the Capitol was a bust of Sojourner Truth. The Architect of the Capitol was clear that each state can have two and only two statues in the National Statuary Hall Collection, consequently the statue of Harriet Tubman was never created.

=== Florida's Mary McLeod Bethune Statue ===
Nilda Comas, a Florida artist, works on a clay version of the Mary McLeod Bethune statue to be installed in Statuary Hall in Washington.

In the National Statuary Hall Collection the state of Florida is represented by statues of John Gorrie, a physician, scientist, inventor, and humanitarian and General Edmund Kirby Smith, a Confederate General. In 2016, Florida resident Lynette Long, founder of Equal Visibility Everywhere, traveled to Tallahassee to promote the placement of a statue honoring a woman in the National Statuary Hall. She addressed the Florida State Legislature's Women's Caucus, lobbied individual members of the state legislature, and testified on behalf of FLHB 141, urging the body to add a woman to the National Statuary Collection.

The Florida Legislature passed the bill which would remove the statue of General Edmund Kirby Smith from the National Statuary Hall Collection and create a commission to propose names of three statue candidates to the Florida legislature. The recommendations were environmentalist Marjory Stoneman Douglas, Publix founder George Washington Douglas, and educator Mary McLeod Bethune. The following legislative session, a bill proposing Mary McLeod Bethune to represent the state of Florida was passed then signed by former Governor Rick Scott making Mary McLeod Bethune the first African American to be honored with a statue in the National Statuary Hall Collection.

General Edmund Kirby Smith Statue Removal Backlash Following the passage of the 2018 bill to replace the statue of General Edmund Kirby Smith with Mary McLeod Bethune, a state panel considered proposals of where to display the Smith statue when it was removed from the US Capitol. The panel agreed to relocate the statue to Lake County Historical Museum located in Tavares, Florida, based on a proposal by its curator, Bob Grenier. In 2019, the Lake County Board of County Commissioners voted 3 - 2, approving the Smith statue installation at the Lake County Historical Museum. Despite the vote of approval, roughly 400 protestors gathered in opposition to the placement of the monument of Confederate General Smith in Lake County. Eight Lake County Mayors signed a letter to Gov. Ron DeSantis asking for action to prevent the installment of the Smith statue in the Tavares museum. Florida Governor DeSantis did not respond. Lake County Board of County Commissioners' Chairwoman, a supporter of the move said, "The thought of bringing a Confederate statue to Lake County really bothers a lot of our African American population and also a lot of creative thinkers like myself“ It is important to preserve statues and monuments which tell the story of where we’ve come from and where we are today, even if those artifacts invoke strong emotions.”

=== California's Sally Ride Statue ===
The state of California is currently represented by statues of former U.S. President Ronald Reagan and Catholic Saint, Father Junipero Serra. The Serra statue has remained in the National Statuary Hall since 1931. The statue of Ronald Reagan is a "replacement statue" and was gifted to the Capitol in 2007. In 2015, California State Senator Ricardo Lara's bill to replace the statue of Father Serra with a statue of Sally Ride was introduced in California's Senate Government Organization Committee and passed 10–0. The bill then went to the California Senate where it narrowly passed. The bill was never heard in the Assembly due to opposition from the Catholic caucus. Pope Francis was scheduled to canonize Rev. Junipero Serra and bless the Serra statue in National Statuary Hall. If Sally Ride were to be added to The Collection, she would be the first statue of a known LGBT person. Ride, who earned a Doctorate in Physics from Stanford University is most remembered for her contributions to science and being the first U.S. woman astronaut in space.

Father Junipero Serra Controversy

Many Native American leaders see Father Junipero Serra as guilty of slavery and violent evangelicalism during his mission work in 18th-century America. Under the direction of Father Junipero Serra, Spanish soldiers forced the native peoples living in the areas to build the Spanish missions. Jean François de Galaup, a French explorer made critical observations on the Spanish missions around the treatment of California native peoples. It is estimated that California's Native American population was roughly 310,000 at the beginning of Spanish mission work. By the end of the 19th century, California's indigenous peoples had been reduced to approximately 100,000.

=== Historic Markers ===
Florida's Department of State recognizes significant places, persons, and events in Florida via the Historical Markers Program. In 2017 only six of the 950 state markers are of women: Annie Tommie, a Seminole Leader with a camp on the new river in Fort Lauderdale in the 1800s; Harriet Beecher Stowe, the author of “Uncle Tom's Cabin” who wintered in Mandarin, Florida; Milly Francis, labeled the Creek Pocahontas for saving the life of a Georgia Militiaman; Princess Marie Antoinette Murat, the great-grandniece of George Washington and married to the nephew of Napoleon; women's rights activist Roxcy Bolton, and Zora Neale Hurston, author of “Their Eyes Were Watching God.”

Dr. Lynette Long, Founder of Equal Visibility Everywhere, speaking before the unveiling of the Dr. Galt Simmons historic marker in Miami Beach, FL

Equal Visibility Everywhere, the Miami-Dade County Commission for Women and the Kampong of the National Tropical Botanical Garden obtained permission and produced the historical marker honoring Dr. Eleanor Galt Simmons, Miami's first female physician.

Long has been successful in getting the State of Florida to approve markers for aviator Amelia Earhart, Seminole Chief Betty Mae Tiger Jumper, historic preservationist Barbara Baer Capitman, Miami Founder Julia Tuttle, and Marathon Swimmer Diana Nyad. She cooperated with other groups to help erect markers of other noted Floridians including Impresaria Judy Drucker and Preservationist Marjory Stoneman Douglas.

Before 2007, only three of the 650 Official Scenic Markers in New Mexico mentioned women. In response, the New Mexico State Legislature passed the Historic Women Marker Initiative of 2007. One hundred markers honoring women have been added to the state's collection since 2010 and to bring the total of historic markers to 103.

== Stamp Out Stamp Bias ==
Equal Visibility Everywhere's stamps project, Stamp Out Stamp Bias, is dedicated to eliminating gender disparity in United States postage stamps. Men depicted on U.S. stamps outnumber women by four to one. From 2000 to 2009 the U.S. Postal Service honored 206 individuals on commemorative stamps; only 43 were women. As of February 2019, there are 138 stamps honoring women and 660 stamps honoring men.

== Street Naming ==
Equal Visibility Everywhere's street naming project focuses on naming more streets after notable women. Their approach is to count the number of streets named after men vs. women and report the results to the appropriate legislative body. For example, Dr. Lynette Long, EVE"s President, did a presentation before the Miami Beach City Commission explaining that in the entire City of Miami Beach only one street was named after women. As a result of her efforts, more streets are being named after women including one for Miami Sound Machine Founder, Gloria Estefan.
