= Prime Minister's Science and Technology Advisory Council =

Council in New Zealand

The Prime Minister's Science and Technology Advisory Council is a scientific advisory group in New Zealand, established to provide advice to the government on science funding priorities.

== Role ==
The Prime Minister's Science and Technology Advisory Council was established in May 2025, as part of the science system reforms overseen by Peter Gluckman. Their role is to provide advice to the government on priorities for science and technology funding, including identifying areas that are not of sufficient economic benefit to warrant investment. They will also identify opportunities or commercialisation of science, and will ensure that funding priorities are aligned with the New Zealand government's economic strategy. Members are appointed for three years, and are able to serve a maximum of two terms.

== Membership ==
- Hon. Shane Reti, Minister of Science, Innovation and Technology (Chair)
- Dr John Roche, Prime Minister's Chief Science Advisor (Deputy Chair).
- Craig Piggott, Entrepreneur who developed a monitoring system for farm animals,
- Komal Mistry-Mehta, Barrister and Accountant who is a senior manager in venture capital at Fonterra,
- Malcolm Johns, Chief Executive Genesis Energy and previously CEO of Christchurch Airport.
- Dr Merryn Tawhai, Respiratory Bioengineer and Professor at the University of Auckland
- Sir Peter Gluckman, former Prime Minister's Chief Science Advisor.

Commentators noted that there was a strong emphasis on agricultural science experience on the Council, and an absence of expertise in Mātauranga Māori.
