= Ngā Tapuwae College =

Former state secondary school in Auckland, New Zealand

Location
- Māngere East, Auckland; New Zealand
- Coordinates: 36.9642°S 174.8165°E

Information
- Type: State secondary school (closed)
- Motto: Ina te mahi, he rangatira (By deeds a chief is known)
- Opened: 3 February 1976
- Closed: February 1997
- Principal: Ann Gluckman (1976–1989)
- Gender: Co-educational
- Age range: 13–18 (Years 9–13)

Ngā Tapuwae College was a state secondary school located in Māngere East, Auckland, New Zealand. Opened in 1976 as an innovative "prototype" community college, the school was designed to integrate deeply with the surrounding area by providing shared facilities and focusing on the cultural needs of its predominantly Māori and Pacific Islander student body. Following governance issues and a highly critical Education Review Office report in 1995, the school's Board of Trustees was dismissed. The college was subsequently closed as a standalone entity and amalgamated with two neighbouring schools in February 1997 to form the Southern Cross Campus. The legacy of the college continues through its highly successful Māori immersion unit, which survived the amalgamation and evolved into an independent kura (Māori-language school), Te Kura Māori o Ngā Tapuwae.

== Etymology ==
The name Ngā Tapuwae translates from te reo Māori as "the footsteps". The name honours the footsteps of Māori ancestors (ngā tapuwae o ngā tūpuna), specifically referring to the volcano deity Mataoho, who, according to local Māori narrative, left his footprints across the landscape, forming the region's lagoons and volcanic features. The name also acknowledges historical figures who traversed the area, including the first Māori King, Pōtatau Te Wherowhero. In an educational context, a tapuwae also refers to an incantation to ensure fleetness of foot in intellectual pursuits or athletic prowess.

== History ==
=== Establishment and community model ===
The concept of the Ngā Tapuwae Community Education Complex was developed in the 1970s as a joint initiative between the Department of Internal Affairs, the Department of Education, and the Manukau City Council. Intended to serve as a pioneering model for New Zealand education, the complex was designed to break down the traditional barriers between a school and its neighbourhood. Ngā Tapuwae College officially opened on 3 February 1976. Ann Gluckman served as the college's principal for 13 years, from its opening until her retirement in 1989, navigating the complexities of establishing a large, multicultural community college in South Auckland. From its inception, the school had a strong focus on Māori education. Educators Te Kepa Stirling and his wife Pani Takawhenua Waipapa Stirling chose to teach at the newly opened Ngā Tapuwae to establish a dedicated Māori unit. Initially starting with two form classes, the unit grew into a full bilingual programme known as Te Reo Rua o Ngā Tapuwae. The Stirlings pioneered a whānau-based educational system within the mainstream secondary school, encouraging active participation from extended families.

=== Facilities ===
Unlike traditional secondary schools, Ngā Tapuwae was built with extensive community amenities meant to be shared by students, local churches, sports clubs, the Māori Women's Welfare League, and the general public. A combined school and public library opened on the campus in February 1978. Other shared facilities included a youth centre, a gymnasium, an audio-visual lecture theatre, and the first crèche located on a New Zealand school campus. In April 1983, the complex was expanded with a public hall, an arts and crafts block, a sports pavilion, and traditional Māori hāngi and Samoan umu cooking facilities.

=== Decline and amalgamation ===
In the early 1990s, the college began to encounter significant governance, educational, and social difficulties. On 19 January 1995, following a highly critical report from the Education Review Office (ERO) regarding the management and educational outcomes at the school, then-Minister of Education Lockwood Smith took the severe step of dismissing the school's Board of Trustees. He appointed former Auckland Grammar School headmaster John Graham as a statutory commissioner to manage the failing institution. To address systemic issues across several local schools, the Ministry of Education enacted a major restructuring. In February 1997, Ngā Tapuwae College was officially closed as a standalone entity and amalgamated with the neighbouring Māngere Intermediate School and Southern Cross Primary School. Together, they formed a new composite (Year 1 to 13) school named Te Taki O Autahi, which was later simplified to Southern Cross Campus.

== Legacy: Te Kura Māori o Ngā Tapuwae ==
Despite the closure of the mainstream college, the bilingual Māori unit established by the Stirlings had proven highly successful. Commissioner John Graham recognised the unit's high achievement amidst the wider school's difficulties and encouraged the founders to establish their own autonomous school. In 1996, Te Kura Māori o Ngā Tapuwae was founded as a "school within a school" sharing the Southern Cross Campus site. It gained distinct school status in 1997 with the appointment of its own director, Arihia Stirling (daughter of the founders). In January 2011, it officially opened as an independent Kura-ā-Iwi. The kura carries on the original name and cultural mandate of the college, and has become noted for holding some of the highest NCEA pass rates in New Zealand.

== See also ==
• List of schools in Auckland • Southern Cross Campus
