= Merryn Tawhai =

New Zealand academic

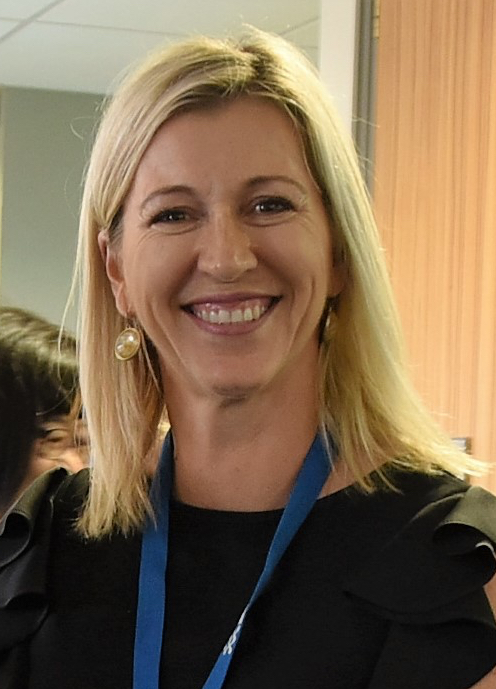
Tawhai in 2019

Merryn Tawhai FRSNZ is a New Zealand engineering scientist. She is a professor at the University of Auckland, director of the Auckland Bioengineering Institute, where she was a fellow from 2002, and a former director of MedTech CoRE. She is known for the development of mathematical models of the lungs that will help scientists understand differences between physiologically normal lungs and the pathological changes that might occur in a disease. She was inducted into the International Academy of Medical and Biological Engineering in June 2018. In November 2018, Tawhai was elected a Fellow of the Royal Society of New Zealand.

== Life ==
When Tawhai was in high school, her favorite subjects were mathematics and biology. In 2001, she graduated with a PhD in engineering physics from the University of Auckland. Her doctoral thesis, supervised by Andrew Pullan and Peter Hunter, was titled An anatomically based mathematical model of the human lungs, applied to gas mixing and water vapour and heat transport. She had two children during her PhD studies.

Following her PhD studies, Tawhai was a research fellow at the American Institute for Medical and Biological Engineering beginning in 2002.

In 2013, Tawhai was appointed deputy director of the Auckland Bioengineering Institute (ABI).

In 2015, Tawhai was appointed deputy director, and then from 2018 to 2021 director, of the Medical Technologies Centre of Research Excellence (MedTech CoRE). She remains part of the research network of this organisation.

In 2023, Tawhai was appointed director of the Auckland Bioengineering Institute (ABI).

In May 2025 Tawhai was announced as an inaugural member of the Prime Minister's Science and Technology Advisory Council, which was established to advise government on funding priorities in New Zealand science, including identifying areas that could receive less funding.

== Awards ==
In 2016, Tawhai was awarded the MacDiarmid Medal by the Royal Society of New Zealand, and the following year she was named one of the Royal Society Te Apārangi's "150 women in 150 words", celebrating women's contributions to knowledge in New Zealand.

Tawhai is a Fellow of the International Academy of Medical and Biological Engineering, and a Fellow of the American Institute for Medical and Biological Engineering.
