= Lynette Long =

American psychologist

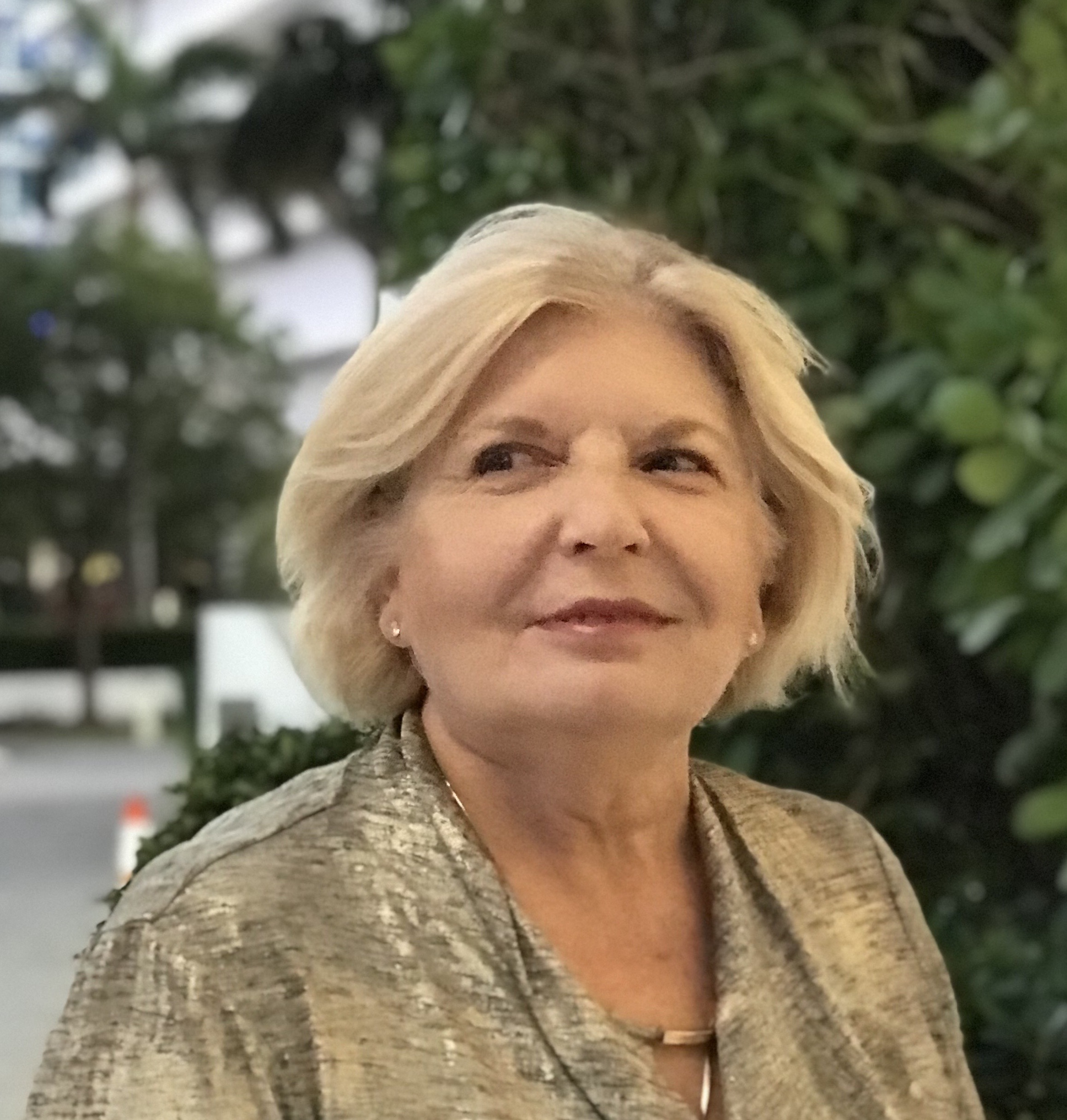
- Long in 2017
- Born: Bronx, New York, United States
- Citizenship: United States, Italy
- Education: University of Illinois
- Occupations: Professor, author
- Website: www.EqualVisibilityEverywhere.org

Lynette Long is an American educator who is an advocate for women's rights. She is the chair of the Miami Beach Women's Commission and previously served on the Miami-Dade County Commission for Women. She is president and founder of the not-for-profit Equal Visibility Everywhere. She is also the founder and chair of The Florida Women's Historical Marker Initiative. Her primary work is increasing the visibility of women in United States symbols and icons. A former university professor, Long has published more than 30 books and dozens of articles in trade and professional journals, including over a dozen books in mathematics for students from elementary school through high school. Long coined the phrase "latchkey children" with her husband Thomas Long and wrote a book on the subject, The Handbook for Latchkey Children and Their Working Parents. Long is a feminist and contributor to the feminist movement in the United States.

== Early life and education ==
Lynette Long was born Lynette Nava on April 23, 1948 in the Bronx, New York. Her father, Giovanna Nava, was an Italian immigrant arriving in the United States at six years old. Her mother, Margaret Greene, was of German and English origin, and could trace her father's ancestry all the way back to the Mayflower. She attended elementary and middle school in the South Bronx and high school in Cleveland, Ohio and Chicago, Illinois. Upon high school graduation, she attended the University of Illinois in Champaign-Urbana where she received a bachelor's, master's and doctoral degree.

== Career ==
Long is the founder and president of Equal Visibility Everywhere (EVE), a not-for-profit that focuses on researching the under-representation of women on our nation's currency, stamps, statues, monuments and memorials, street names, and historical markers. Long was the first person to bring national attention to the fact that there were no woman represented on US paper currency. As a result of her work and the efforts of other feminist groups, the Treasury Department promised to feature women on United States paper currency.

In 2010, Long's research brought national attention to the fact that only nine of the one hundred statues in National Statuary Hall in the United States Capitol honor women. Long was instrumental in securing authorization for a statue of Amelia Earhart in the United States Capitol. Long was also instrumental in the removal of the statue of Confederate General Edmund Kirby Smith from the United States Capitol. Smith represented Florida and was replaced with a statue of Mary McLeod Bethune. Long has focused awareness around the country on the general lack of female statuary which has led to an increase in the number of statues of women nationwide.

Long speaking before the unveiling of a Florida Historical Marker honoring Eleanor Galt Simmons.

Long is spearheading the Florida Women's Historical Marker Initiative, an effort to increase the number of Florida State Historical Markers honoring women. At the time of her initial research in 2017, only six of the 950 markers in the State of Florida specifically honored women. Since 2017, Long has found funding for numerous Florida State Historical Markers honoring women including Miami founder Julia Tuttle, Miami Beach preservationist Barbara Baer Capitman, aviatrix Amelia Earhart, doctor Eleanor Galt Simmons, and Seminole chief Betty Mae Tiger Jumper.

In 2024, Long wrote and championed legislation (Florida House Bill 629 and Senate Bill 716) which would require the State of Florida to honor 100 additional women with historical markers in the next decade. In 2025, Long unveiled a Florida Historical Marker honoring Marathon Swimmer, Diana Nyad.

== Writing ==
Long popularized the term "latchkey kid". A former elementary and middle school principal, Long noticed her students wearing house keys on chains around their necks. She interviewed these students and found that they were often lonely or afraid during the time they spent alone at home after school. These initial conversations led to research including hundreds of interviews with latchkey children, their parents, and former latchkey children. The culmination of her work was published in The Handbook for Latchkey Children and Their Working Parents (with Thomas J. Long) and On My Own: The Kids' Self-Care

Long has published over 20 math books for elementary, middle, and high school students. Her books have been translated into Spanish and Indonesian. She has designed mathematics laboratories, written mathematics curricula, designed math games, and published articles on mathematics education in professional journals. She is the founder of Color Math Pink, a website designed to improve girls’ math achievement.

== Museum curator ==
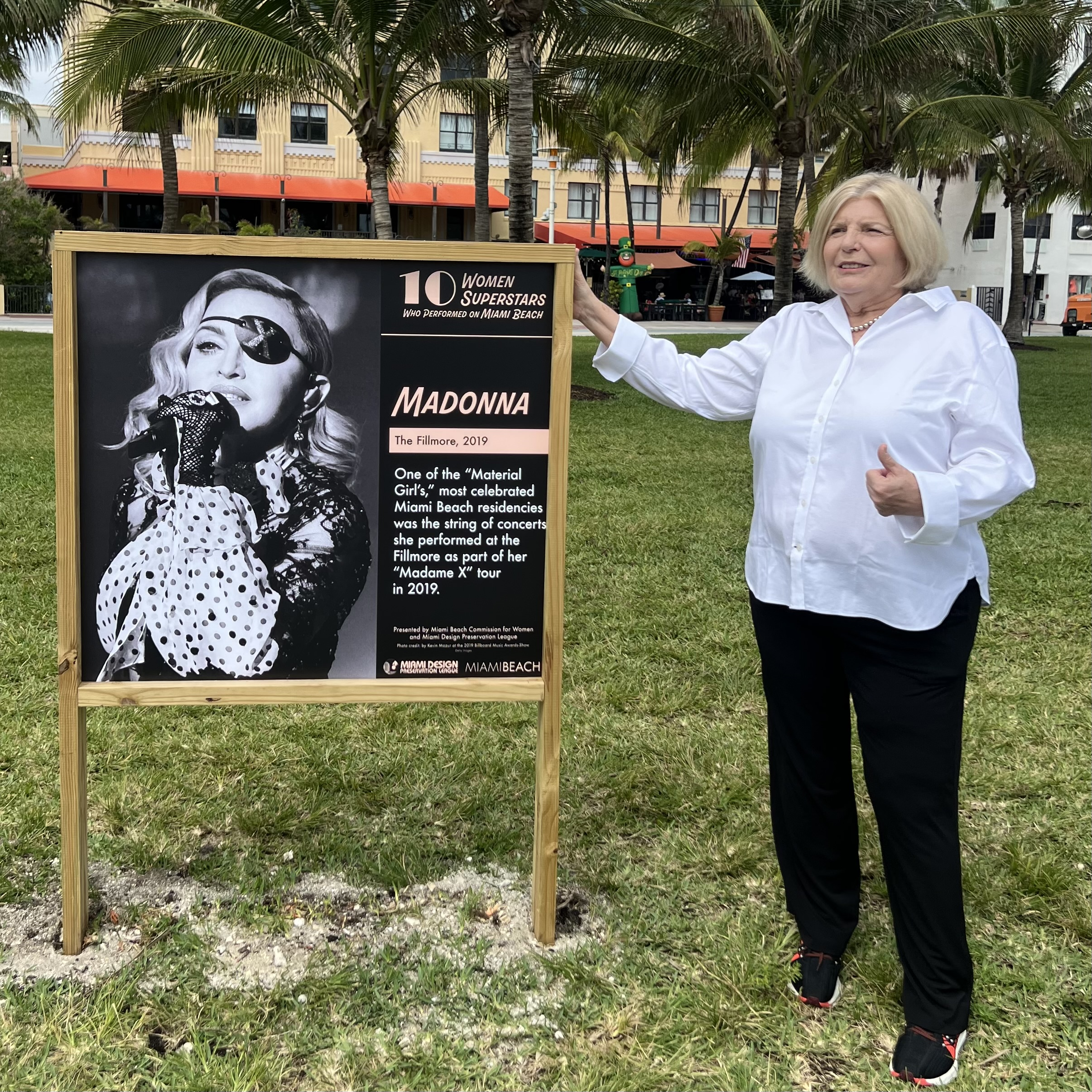
Long with Madonna poster from 10 Women Superstars Exhibit in Miami Beach (2024).

Long has curated museum exhibits in partnership with organizations in Miami Beach, Florida. The exhibits included "The Legacy Couple's Project: 400+ Years of LGBTQ Love," (2022) sponsored by Miami Beach Pride, "Women Who Made a Difference" (2020) and "Unfinished Business" (2020) commemorating the 100th Anniversary of Women's Suffrage in the United States sponsored by the Miami Design Preservation League (2020), “Women Who Made a Difference,” sponsored by the Miami Design Preservation League and the Miami Beach Commission for Women (2023) and “Ten Women Superstars Who Performed on Miami Beach,” sponsored by the Miami Beach Commission for Women and the Miami Design Preservation League, (2024). In 2025 and 2026, Long curated "Ten Exemplary Women" which highlighted the accomplishments on ten five by five feet posters.

== Personal life ==
Long lives in Miami Beach, Florida. She is the mother of two children.

== Selected publications ==
- Long, L., Listening-Responding: Human Relations Training for Teachers, Brooks/Cole Publishers, CA, 1978
- Long, L., Paradise, L., & Long, T., Questioning: Skills for the Helping Process, Wadsworth, Monterey, CA, 1981
- Long, L. & Prophit, P., Understanding/ Responding: Human Relations Development for Nurses, Wadsworth, Monterey, CA, 1981
- Long, L. & Long, T., The Handbook for Latchkey Children and Their Parents, Arbor House, New York, 1983
- Long, Lynette (1984). "On My Own: The Kids' Self Care Book". www.abebooks.com. AbeBooks. ISBN 9780874917352.
- Long, L. & Hershberger, E., One Year to a College Degree, Huntington House Publishers, Louisiana, 1992
- Long, Lynette (1992). Understanding/responding: A Communication Manual for Nurses. Jones and Bartlett. ISBN 978-0-86720-433-9.
- Long, L. (1996). "Domino Addition". Charlesbridge.
- Long, Lynette (1997). Sumemos con el dominó (in Spanish). Charlesbridge. ISBN 978-0-88106-909-9.
- Long, L. (1998). Painless Algebra. ISBN 978-0-7641-3434-0.
- Long, Lynette (April 1998). One Dollar: My First Book about Money. Barron's Educational Series, Incorporated. ISBN 978-0-7641-0319-3.
- Long, Lynette (1998). "Domino 1, 2, 3 (Wonderwise)". www.abebooks.com. AbeBooks. ISBN 9780749631635.
- Long, L., Dealing with Addition, Charlesbridge Publishers, Boston, MA, 1998
- Long, L. (2000). "Dazzling Division: Games and Activities That Make Math Easy and Fun | Wiley". Wiley.com.
- Long, L. (2000). "Marvelous Multiplication: Games and Activities That Make Math Easy and Fun | Wiley". Wiley.com.
- Long, Lynette (2001). Painless Geometry. Simon and Schuster. ISBN 978-1-5062-6805-7.
- Long, L. (2001). "Measurement Mania: Games and Activities That Make Math Easy and Fun | Wiley". Wiley.com.
- Long, L. (2001). "Fabulous Fractions: Games and Activities That Make Math Easy and Fun | Wiley". Wiley.com.
- Long, L. (2002). "Delightful Decimals and Perfect Percents: Games and Activities That Make Math Easy and Fun | Wiley". Wiley.com.
- Long, Lynette (May 13, 2003). Groovy Geometry: Games and Activities That Make Math Easy and Fun. John Wiley & Sons. ISBN 978-0-471-46265-1.
- Long, L. (2004). "Great Graphs and Sensational Statistics: Games and Activities That Make Math Easy and Fun | Wiley". Wiley.com.
- Long, L. (2004). "Math Smarts: Tips, Tricks, and Secrets for Making Math More Fun ..." www.google.com.
- Long, L. (2005). "Wacky Word Problems: Games and Activities That Make Math Easy and ..." www.google.com.
- Long, L., Fractions Diagnostic Test, Fill in the Gaps Publishers, 2020
