= Lynette Tippett =

Professor of psychology in New Zealand

Lynette Tippett ONZM
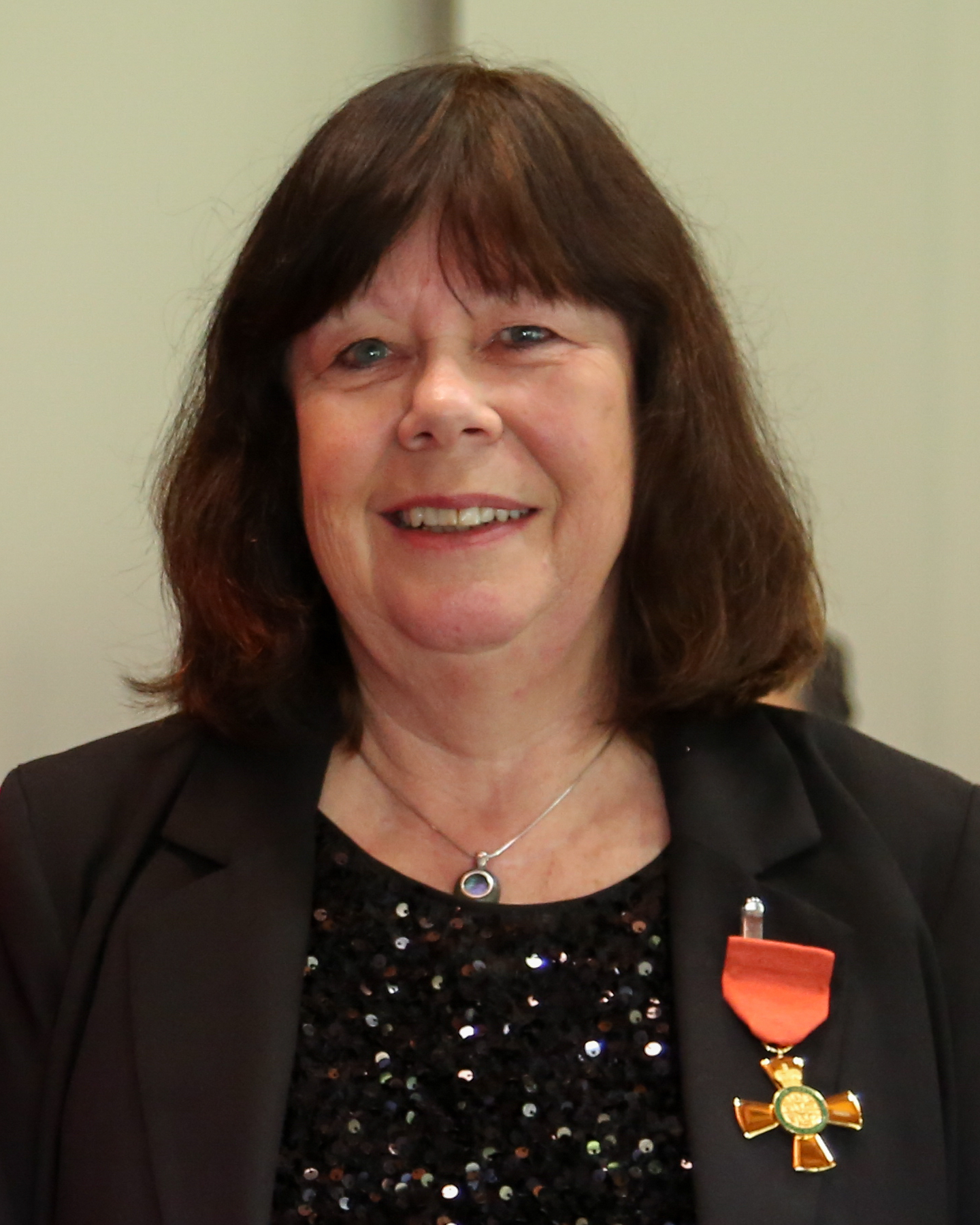
- Tippett in 2023
- Born: Lynette Joy Tippett
- Known for: research on neurodegenerative disease

Academic background
- Education: University of Auckland
- Thesis: Producing mental pictures: a study of visual-image generation processes in brain-lesioned patients (1991)
- Website: orcid.org/0000-0003-4592-6600

Lynette Joy Tippett ONZM is a New Zealand professor of psychology at the University of Auckland, specialising in neurodegenerative diseases.

== Academic career ==
Tippett has a Master's degree in psychology, a Diploma in Clinical Psychology and a doctorate, all from the University of Auckland. Tippett completed her PhD titled Producing mental pictures: a study of visual-image generation processes in brain-lesioned patients in 1991. Tippett then undertook postdoctoral training at the Centre for Cognitive Neuroscience at the University of Pennsylvania, and the Department of Psychology at Carnegie Mellon University. Returning to New Zealand, she joined the faculty of the University of Auckland. She was promoted to full professor. Tippett has taught neuropsychology for more than 30 years, and supervised more than 80 graduate students. Tippett's research focuses on the psychosocial, emotional and cognitive effects of the brain changes that take place in neurodegenerative diseases, such as Huntington's disease, Alzheimer's, frontotemporal dementia and Parkinson's disease, and also due to traumatic brain injury.

Tippett is associate director of the Centre for Brain Research, national director of the Dementia Prevention Research Clinics, and co-director of the Auckland Dementia Prevention Research Clinic. She is a member of the Alzheimer's New Zealand Clinical and Scientific Advisory Board.

== Awards and honours ==
In the 2023 King's Birthday and Coronation Honours, Tippett was appointed an Officer of the New Zealand Order of Merit, for services to neuropsychology and people with dementia.

== Selected works ==
- d'Esposito, Mark; Detre JA; Aguirre GK; Stallcup M; David Alsop; Tippett, Lynette Joy; Farah, Martha Julia (1997). "A functional MRI study of mental image generation". Neuropsychologia. 35 (5): 725–730. doi:10.1016/s0028-3932(96)00121-2. PMID 9153035. Wikidata Q48718927.
- Sally C Prebble; Addis, Donna Rose; Tippett, Lynette Joy (2012). "Autobiographical memory and sense of self". Psychological Bulletin. 139 (4): 815–840. doi:10.1037/a0030146. PMID 23025923. Wikidata Q38048398.
- Addis, Donna Rose; Tippett, Lynette Joy (2004). "Memory of myself: autobiographical memory and identity in Alzheimer's disease". Memory. 12 (1): 56–74. doi:10.1080/09658210244000423. PMID 15098621. Wikidata Q51941483.
- Tippett, Lynette Joy; Waldvogel, Henry; Sally J Thomas; Virginia M Hogg; Willeke van Roon-Mom; Beth J Synek; Ann M Graybiel; Faull, Richard Lewis Maxwell (2006). "Striosomes and mood dysfunction in Huntington's disease". Brain. 130 (Pt 1): 206–221. doi:10.1093/brain/awl243. PMID 17040921. Wikidata Q34573861.
- Latham, Andrew James; Lucy L M Patston; Tippett, Lynette Joy (2013). "The virtual brain: 30 years of video-game play and cognitive abilities". Frontiers in Psychology. 4: 629. doi:10.3389/fpsyg.2013.00629. PMC 3772618. PMID 24062712. Wikidata Q30544693.
