= Gravida (organisation) =

Gravida: National Centre for Growth and Development

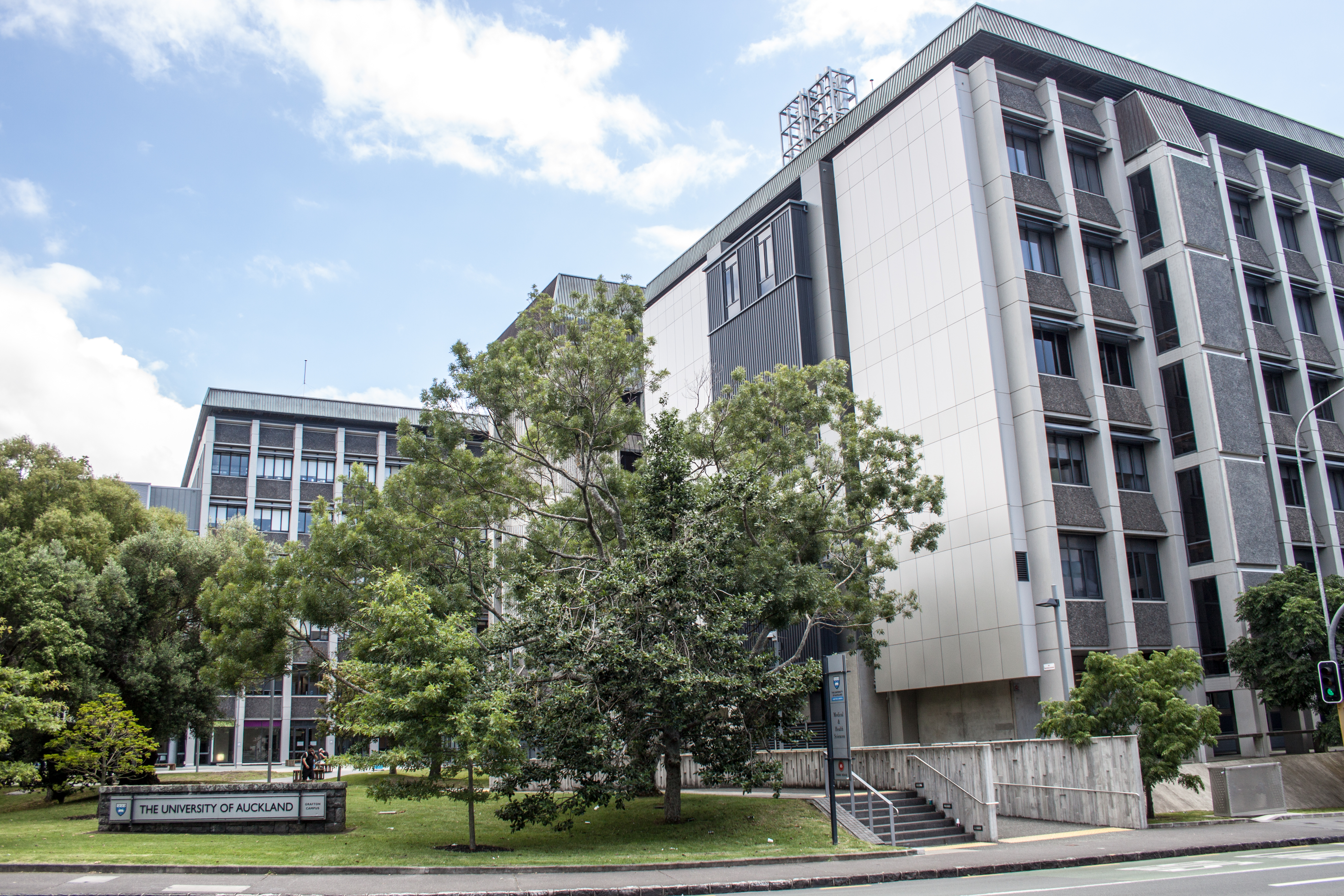
- University of Auckland's Grafton Campus
- Abbreviation: Gravida
- Formation: 2003
- Type: GO
- Purpose: Commissioning research
- Location: Auckland, New Zealand
- Region served: New Zealand
- Leader: Professor Philip Baker
- Parent organization: Tertiary Education Commission
- Website: http://www.gravida.org.nz/

Gravida: National Centre for Growth and Development is a New Zealand government-funded Centre of Research Excellence (CoRE). CoREs are inter-institutional, multi-disciplinary research networks that are tasked with facilitating collaborative research on topics of strategic interest.

== History ==
Gravida was originally set up under the name of the National Research Centre for Growth and Development (NRCGD) in 2003 and was initially headed by Professor Sir Peter Gluckman. The name was changed from NRCGD to Gravida in November 2012.

== Main areas of research ==
The organisation is focused on funding research into epigenetics, phenotypic plasticity, physiology, medicine, and evolutionary medicine. The main research question is how environmental influences such as nutrition and maternal weight, before, during and shortly after pregnancy can alter the way humans and animals develop. The aim is to translate research findings into better health for the community, as well as into increased agricultural productivity.

== Members ==
Gravida provides research funding to researchers within the following ‘member organisations’:

- Massey University,
- The University of Otago,
- The University of Canterbury,
- AgResearch Limited,
- Landcorp Farming,
- The University of Auckland.

The organisation is hosted by the University of Auckland, New Zealand.

== Membership ==
Gravida is a member of the Association of Centres of Research Excellence (aCoRE), NZ.

== Funding ==
Gravida, and the other CoREs, are funded by the New Zealand government through the Tertiary Education Commission. Funding is allocated through a competitive funding round that takes place every 6 years.
