= Andrew Pullan =

New Zealand mathematician (1963–2012)

- Born: Andrew John Pullan; 1963
- Died: 7 March 2012 (aged 48–49); Auckland, New Zealand
- Education: University of Auckland
- Scientific career
- Fields: Biomedical engineering
- Workplaces: University of Auckland
- Thesis: Quasilinearised infiltration and the boundary element method (1988)
- Doctoral students: Merryn Tawhai

Andrew John Pullan (1963 – 7 March 2012) was a New Zealand mathematician specialising in bio-electrical modelling. He was a fellow of the Royal Society of New Zealand.

== Academic career ==
After attending Aorere College in Papatoetoe, Pullan received a scholarship to the University of Auckland where he studied mathematics before moving to the engineering school to work on biomedical engineering finite-element models of the heart and models of electrical activity in the gastrointestinal tract. His 1988 doctoral thesis was titled Quasilinearised infiltration and the boundary element method with Professor Ian Collins as his supervisor. He was appointed head of department from 2008 to 2010. He died in March 2012 of metastatic melanoma.

== Selected works ==
- New advances in gastrointestinal motility research
- Mathematically modelling the electrical activity of the heart : from cell to body surface and back again
