= Aorere College =

Location
- Portage Road; Papatoetoe; Auckland, 2025; New Zealand; 36.982°S 174.8334°E

Information
- Type: State secondary, day
- Motto: Virtus Caelum Recludit (Character opens the way to the heavens)
- Established: 1964
- Ministry of Education Institution no.: 96
- Principal: Leanne Webb
- Years: 9–13
- Gender: Co-educational
- Enrolment: 1,701 (July 2026)
- Socio-economic decile: 2D
- Website: aorere.ac.nz

Aorere College is a New Zealand co-educational state secondary school (Years 9–13) that was established in 1964 in the Auckland suburb of Papatoetoe. The current principal of the college is Leanne Webb. As of July 2026, there are approximately 1,701 students, and around 150 staff at Aorere College.

== History ==
Aorere College was founded in 1964 under the tentative name Papatoetoe West Post Primary School, to serve Māngere East and Papatoetoe West, and to ease overcrowding at Papatoetoe High School. The founding principal, Charles Herbert, decided on a new name and the school was renamed Aorere College in 1965. The name is a portmanteau of the Māori words Ao (clouds or sky) and Rere (to fly), indicating the school's vision for its students "to rise up and climb to the greatest heights in every aspect of their learning and achievements". It also reflected the school's proximity to Auckland Airport.

In 2015, Aorere College was put on a 4–5 year Education Review Office cycle due to the school's high level of administrative and academic offerings.

== Enrolment ==
As of July 2026, Aorere College has a roll of 1,701 students, of which 317 (18.6%) identify as Māori.

As of 2026, the school has an Equity Index of 497, placing it amongst schools whose students have many socioeconomic barriers to achievement (roughly equivalent to deciles 2 and 3 under the former socio-economic decile system).

== Facilities ==
Like many New Zealand secondary schools built in the 1960s, Aorere College was constructed to the Nelson Two-Storey standard plan, distinguished by its two-storey H-shaped classroom blocks. Subsequently, new buildings have been added to accommodate increased student numbers. Developments include a second gymnasium, the Colin Pascoe Gymnasium opened in 2010 and named after the school's second principal, and remodelling of and extension to the hard technology facility in 2018.

The school now has 1GB Wi-Fi across the campus, five computer labs, and approximately 1200 Chromebooks. All students have access to the G Suite for Education learning ecosystem.

== Notable alumni ==
- Donna Rose Addis – neuroscientist
- Gary Troup – cricketer and politician
- Andrew John Pullan – applied mathematician
- Keven Mealamu – rugby union player
- Pene Pati – operatic tenor
- Lorna Suafoa – netball player
- Marata Niukore – rugby league player
- Mark Hunt – kickboxer and mixed martial artist
- Jocelyn Lees – NZ shooter, Olympian, Commonwealth Games Medallist

== See also ==
- List of schools in the Auckland region
