= Juliet Gerrard =

New Zealand chemist

Dame Juliet Gerrard DNZM FRSNZ
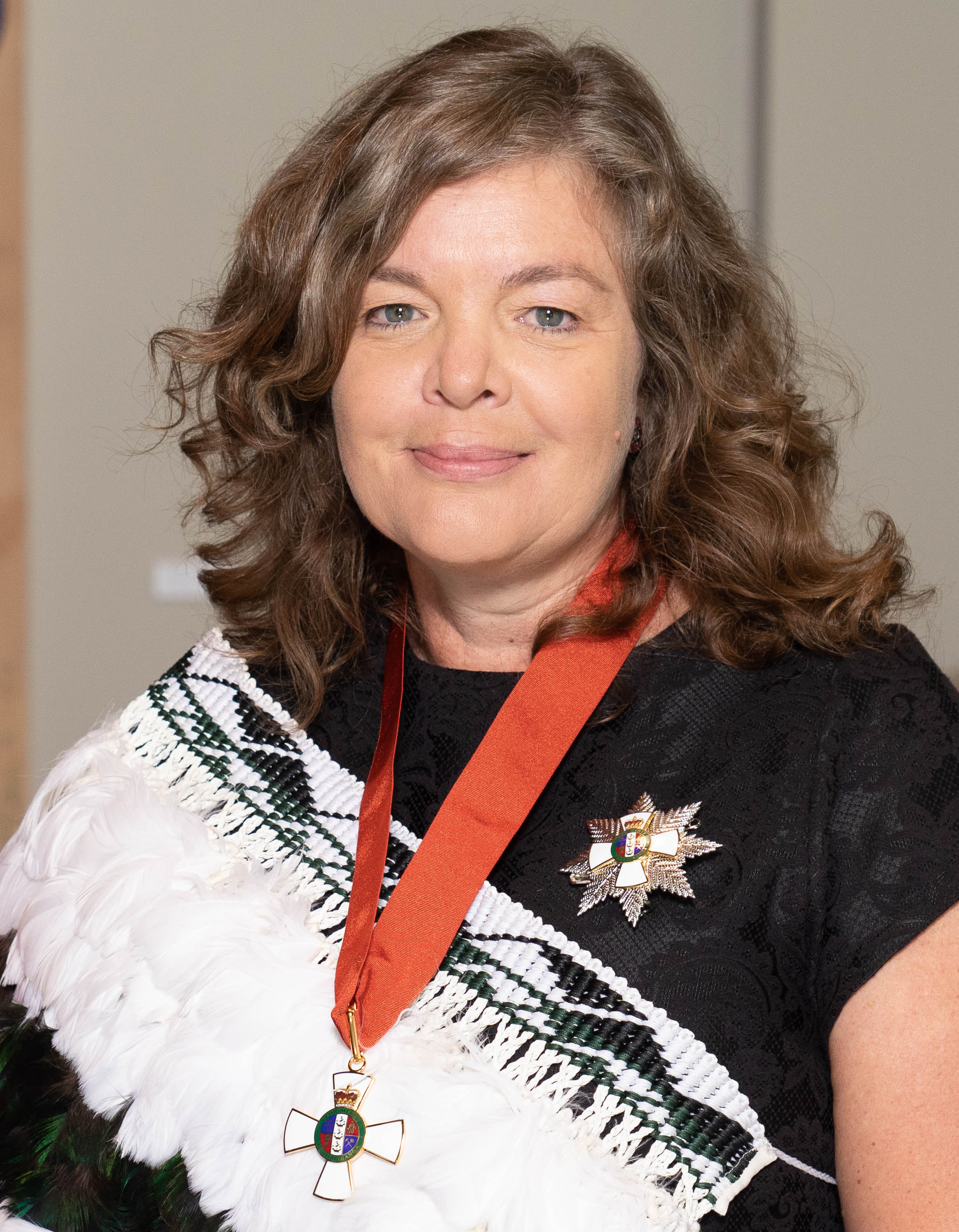
- Gerrard in 2021
- Born: Juliet Ann Gerrard; 1967 (age 58–59); Nottingham, England, UK
- Education: University of Oxford
- Awards: IRL Industry and Outreach Fellowship, Fellow of the Royal Society of New Zealand, Honorary Fellow of the Royal Society of Chemistry
- Scientific career
- Fields: Biochemistry
- Workplaces: Crop and Food, University of Canterbury, University of Auckland
- Thesis: Studies on dihydrodipicolinate synthase (1992)
- Website: Official biography

Dame Juliet Ann Gerrard DNZM FRSNZ (born 1967) is a New Zealand biochemistry academic. She is a professor at the University of Auckland and was New Zealand Prime Minister's Chief Science Advisor during the administration of Jacinda Ardern.

== Early life ==
Gerrard was born in Nottingham, Nottinghamshire, England, in 1967. Her family frequently moved around the United Kingdom when she was a child, living in various locations including Nottingham, Wales and Grimsby. She liked science and focused on chemistry in her studies.

== Education and career ==
Gerrard obtained a first-class honours degree in chemistry at the University of Oxford and then in 1992 a DPhil titled Studies on dihydrodipicolinate synthase, also from Oxford. She moved to Crop and Food in New Zealand in 1997 and then the University of Canterbury in 1998, where she rose to full professor. She then moved to a professorship at the University of Auckland in 2014, where she holds a Callaghan Innovation Industry and Outreach Fellowship. Having been the recipient of Marsden grants herself in 1998 and 2003, Gerrard went on to serve as the chair of the Royal Society of New Zealand's Marsden Fund Council from 2012 until 2018.

Her research includes investigations of protein-protein interactions, lysine biosynthesis (particularly the enzyme dihydrodipicolinate synthase) and the application of protein chemistry to the food industry. She has over 175 publications, including three books.

In June 2018 she was appointed the New Zealand Prime Minister's Chief Science Advisor, succeeding Sir Peter Gluckman and taking up the role for two three-year terms starting 1 July 2018. In her role she has tried to "draw on as many science voices as possible", and to be "rigorous, transparent, accessible and inclusive".

== Honours and awards ==
In 2004, Gerrard won a National Teaching Award for Sustained Excellence in Teaching. In 2012, she was elected a Fellow of the Royal Society of New Zealand. In 2018, she was made an Honorary Fellow of the Royal Society of Chemistry.

In the 2021 New Year Honours, Gerrard was appointed a Dame Companion of the New Zealand Order of Merit, for services to science. In 2017, Gerrard was selected as one of the Royal Society Te Apārangi's "150 women in 150 words", celebrating the contributions of women to knowledge in New Zealand.

== Other ==
She has a koru tattoo on her back, purchased for by her lab group for being made professor before her fortieth birthday.

She has spun out her own company called Hi-Aspect, which produces protein nanofibres for medical and other uses.

She is divorced and has two children.

== Selected works ==
=== Books ===
- Gerrard, Juliet A. (2013). Protein Nanotechnology: Protocols, Instrumentation, and Applications, Second Edition (Methods in Molecular Biology). ISBN 978-1-62703-353-4.

=== Journal papers ===
- Gerrard, Juliet A. (2002). "Protein–protein crosslinking in food: methods, consequences, applications". Trends in Food Science & Technology. 13 (12): 391–399. doi:10.1016/S0924-2244(02)00257-1. ISSN 0924-2244.
- de Zwart, F.J.; Slow, S.; Payne, R.J.; Lever, M.; George, P.M.; Gerrard, J.A.; Chambers, S.T. (2003). "Glycine betaine and glycine betaine analogues in common foods". Food Chemistry. 83 (2): 197–204. doi:10.1016/S0308-8146(03)00063-3. ISSN 0308-8146.
- Gerrard, J.A.; Fayle, S.E.; Wilson, A.J.; Newberry, M.P.; Ross, M.; Kavale, S. (1998). "Dough Properties and Crumb Strength of White Pan Bread as Affected by Microbial Transglutaminase". Journal of Food Science. 63 (3): 472–475. doi:10.1111/j.1365-2621.1998.tb15766.x. ISSN 0022-1147.
- Hutton, Craig A.; Perugini, Matthew A.; Gerrard, Juliet A. (2007). "Inhibition of lysine biosynthesis: an evolving antibiotic strategy". Molecular BioSystems. 3 (7): 458–465. doi:10.1039/b705624a. ISSN 1742-206X. PMID 17579770.
- Rasiah, I.A.; Sutton, K.H.; Low, F.L.; Lin, H.-M.; Gerrard, J.A. (2005). "Crosslinking of wheat dough proteins by glucose oxidase and the resulting effects on bread and croissants". Food Chemistry. 89 (3): 325–332. doi:10.1016/j.foodchem.2004.02.052. hdl:2292/22198. ISSN 0308-8146.
