= St Cuthbert's College, Auckland =

St Cuthbert's College

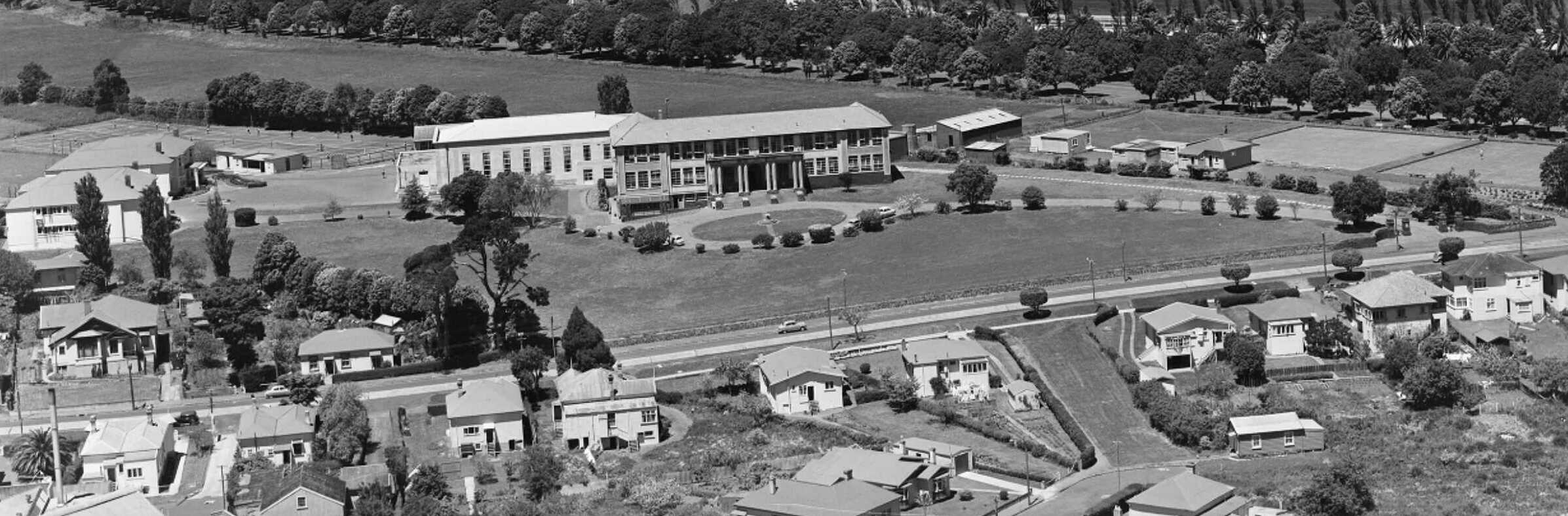
- Aerial photograph of St Cuthbert's College in 1957

Location
- 122 Market Road; Epsom; Auckland 1051; New Zealand; 36°53′14″S 174°46′45″E

Information
- Type: Private, Day & Boarding
- Motto: By Love, Serve
- Denomination: Presbyterian
- Established: 1915; 111 years ago
- Ministry of Education Institution no.: 68
- Principal: Charlotte Avery
- Years offered: 0–13
- Gender: Girls
- Enrolment: 1,643 (July 2026)
- Website: www.stcuthberts.school.nz

St Cuthbert's College is a private (independent) Presbyterian-based day and boarding school for girls aged 4 to 18 (Years 0 to 13), located in Epsom, Auckland, New Zealand.

The school was established in 1915 in Mt Eden, and has a roll of approximately 1650 students. It is widely regarded as one of the best academically performing schools in New Zealand. In 2015, Metro Magazine stated that "the top academic results in Auckland, every year, are scored by St Cuthbert’s College" and the school has been awarded the title of Metro Magazine's Highest-Ranked Auckland Secondary School for Academic Achievement in 2013, 2014 (when the equivalent of 53 per cent of the Year 13 roll gained scholarships), 2015, 2016, 2017, 2018, 2020 and 2022.

The school is affiliated with the Alliance of Girls' Schools Australasia (AGSA), the New Zealand Boarding Schools' Association (NZBSA), Independent Schools of New Zealand (ISNZ), and is an overseas member of the Association of Heads of Independent Schools of Australia (AHISA).

The school offers its own Year 11 St Cuthbert's Diploma and the option of the International Baccalaureate diplomas or national NCEA qualification from Year 12.

== History ==
The college was established as the Auckland Presbyterian College for Ladies Ltd in 1915, when a group of Presbyterian elders purchased Mt Eden Collegiate, a private school for girls, and appointed Miss Isobel Macdonald as the school's first principal. Miss Macdonald chose the motto, "By Love, Serve", and renamed the school St Cuthbert's College as the Trust Board suggested that a shorter and more distinctive name was required. The school is named after the Northumbrian monk-bishop Saint Cuthbert and, since 1918, it has celebrated St Cuthbert's Day annually in March.

In 1925, the college moved to its present site in Epsom. In 1932, three school houses were established, Dunblane, Elgin and Melrose, each named after places of significance in the life of St Cuthbert.

In 1936, the winter uniform was changed to Black Watch tartan, after the then principal, Lavinia Clouston, had seen the uniform at the Presbyterian Ladies' College, Sydney. Black Watch tartan also has been the summer uniform since 1966.

== School motto ==
The St Cuthbert's College motto is "By Love, Serve". The motto was chosen to encourage students to share, respect the needs of others, accept different viewpoints and to live peacefully.

The school verse comes from 1 Corinthians 13 chapters 1–13 and is consistent with "By Love, Serve", and students are constantly reminded to be "By Love, Serve".

== Enrolment ==
As a private school, St Cuthburt's College charges tuition fees to cover costs. For the 2025 school year, tuition fees for New Zealand residents are $26,568 per year for students in years 0 to 6 and $30,476 per year for students in years 7 and above, with international students charged $53,136 and $60,952 per year respectively. Boarding fees for all students are $20,876 per year.

As of July 2026, St Cuthburt's College has roll of 1,643 students, of which 54 (3.3%) identify as Māori. As a private school, the school is not assigned an Equity Index.

== Boarding ==
St Cuthbert's College accepts both day students and boarding students. Boarding students from Years 7 to 13 live in one of St. Cuthbert's three boarding houses: Dunblane, Elgin or Melrose. The boarding community at St Cuthbert's College is very diverse. Boarders come from Asia, the Pacific Islands and a range of other overseas locations, as well as from both urban and rural New Zealand. An increasing number of boarders are local students living between Karaka and the North Shore.

== Curriculum ==
=== Academic ===
The college offers its own St Cuthbert's Year 11 Diploma, and from Year 12 the option to choose either NCEA or IB.

In 1999 a Thinking Skills programme was introduced based on Art Costa's Habits of Mind. Senior management credit this programme for the college's continuing ranking as one of New Zealand's top schools.

=== Physical education ===
Physical education is compulsory for all students from Years 1 to 11. Students are also given the opportunity to pitch themselves against other top athletes in local, regional and national tournaments as part of the college's Athlete Pathway Programme.

Over 90 per cent of senior students participate in extra-curricular sporting activities.

=== Kahunui ===
In Year 10, the students take part in a four-week experience at Kahunui, a large outdoor living space in the Bay of Plenty bush, where the girls participate in physical activities as well as academic work that is taught by practical applications (e.g. maths is covered in budgeting and English through creative writing journal entries).

During their time at Kahunui, the girls are divided into groups of eight students and they are expected to live in and manage their own residence. The outdoor programme includes overnight sea kayaking and tramping trips.

== Headmistresses/Principal ==
- Isobel MacDonald 1915–1921
- Lavinia Clouston 1921–1948
- Violet Wood 1949–1968
- O.J. Holland 1969–1989
- Frances J. Compton 1989–1995
- Lynda J. Reid 1996–2016
- Roz Mexted 2017
- Justine Mahon 2018–2023
- Suzanne Winthrop 2024 (acting)
- Charlotte Avery 2024–2026

== Notable alumnae ==
Alumni of St Cuthbert's College are commonly referred to as Old Girls, and may elect to join the school's alumni association, the Old Girls' Association. Some notable St Cuthbert's Old Girls include:

- Bianca Babarich-Bacher – Joint winner, New Zealand Young Sailor of the year, Women's 420 sailing world champion and Halberg finalist.
- Alexandra Brewis Slade – anthropologist/social scientist.
- Christine Fletcher – former Member of Parliament for Epsom and Mayor of Auckland
- Philippa Gower – World Record holder and Olympic backstroker in the 1950s
- Julia King – field hockey player, member of Black Sticks Women (2011–)
- Roseanne Liang – film director
- Vicki Lin – presenter on Studio 2
- Katherine Faith (Willow) Macky – one of New Zealand's leading composers of folk-style music and songs (also attended Iona College)
- Stacey Michelsen – field hockey player, member of Black Sticks Women (2009–) (also attended Kamo High School)
- Kim Noakes – New Zealand Black Sticks
- Dr Margaret Orbell – author, editor and academic
- Suji Park – Korean-New Zealand artist
- Polly Powrie – sailor, Olympic gold medallist (2012 London)
- Lucy Talbot – field hockey player, member of Black Sticks Women (2009–)
- Rose Carlyle – author
- Renee Liang – paediatrician, poet, essayist, short story writer, playwright, librettist, theatre producer and medical researcher
- Pamela Allen – author and winner of the Margaret Mahy Medal for children's literature
- Ann Gluckman – author, travel writer, and copresident of the Auckland Council for Christians and Jews
- Katie Doar – New Zealand field hockey player, member of Black Sticks Women – 2019
- Madison Doar – New Zealand field hockey player, member of Black Sticks Women – 2017
- Sulu Tone-Fitzpatrick – former New Zealand netball international.
- Louise Wallace – New Zealand television presenter, actress, and director

== See also ==
- List of schools in New Zealand
- List of boarding schools
