= Martha S. Linet =

American physician epidemiologist

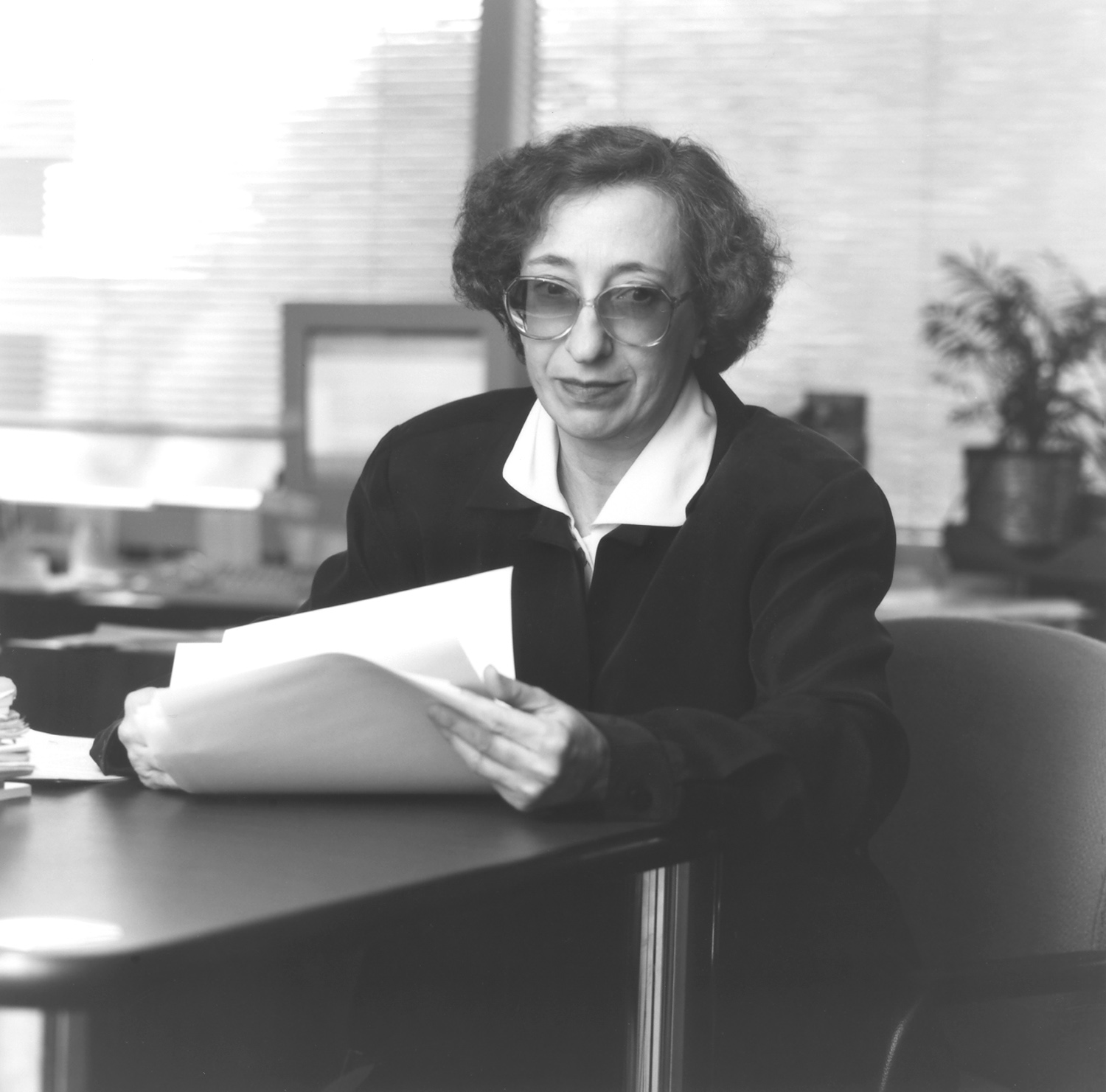
Linet in 1999.

Martha S. Linet is an American physician epidemiologist. She is a scientist emerita at the National Cancer Institute (NCI). Linet retired in January 2020 after 33 years at NCI. She was a senior investigator and branch chief in the NCI radiation epidemiology branch. Linet specialized in epidemiology, the etiology of pediatric and adult leukemia, lymphoma, and brain tumors, as well as the health effects of ionizing and non-ionizing radiation and benzene exposure.

Linet was president of the American College of Epidemiology from 2004 to 2005. She was elected to the American Epidemiological Society in 1999.

Linet completed a Bachelor of Arts, cum laude, at Brandeis University in 1968. She earned a M.D. at Tufts University School of Medicine in 1973. Linet completed a M.P.H. at Johns Hopkins School of Hygiene and Public Health in 1977.
