= Prime Minister's Chief Science Advisor =

Position in New Zealand

The Prime Minister's Chief Science Advisor (PMCSA) is a position in New Zealand, created in 2009. The Chief Science Advisor is responsible for providing independent scientific advice to the government, and may comment on scientific issues publicly.

The first PMCSA was Sir Peter Gluckman, who held the position for nine years. He was followed by Dame Juliet Gerrard, whose term finished in 2024. The role was vacant from 2024, until in May 2025 it was announced John Roche would be taking up the role.

== Role ==
The Office of the Prime Minister's Chief Science Advisor is positioned within the Department of the Prime Minister and Cabinet. The position was created in 2009, and appointees have served terms from two to five years.

== Chief Science Advisors ==
=== Sir Peter Gluckman ===
The first PMCSA was Sir Peter, who held the position for nine years, from its establishment in 2009. Initially appointed for a term of two years as a single-person Ministerial Advisory Committee, Gluckman was reappointed for a three-year term in 2011, and then reappointed again. Gluckman stepped down from the role in 2018. During his first two terms, Gluckman released special reports on methamphetamine precursors, the interaction between science and business, on science education, evidence in policy, and adolescence. Between 2013 and 2015, he released reports on evidence of health benefits of raw milk consumption, the risk of non-occupational asbestos exposure, health effects of fluoridation, climate change in New Zealand and the role of evidence in the formation of policy.

=== Dame Juliet Gerrard ===
Gluckman was followed by Dame Juliet, who was appointed in June 2018 for a five-year term, which finished in June 2024. The Chief Science Advisor's Forum remained active, however, and was chaired by GNS Science scientist and MBIE Chief Science Advisor, Gill Jolly.

=== John Roche ===
The role of PMCSA was vacant for 310 days from 2024, until in May 2025 it was announced John Roche would be taking up the role. Roche was previously an agricultural scientist at DairyNZ and then from 2018 was Chief Science Advisor at the Ministry for Primary Industries. Alongside his position as PMCSA, it was announced Roche would be deputy chair of the new Prime Minister's Science and Technology Advisory Council. The council's role is to advise government on "science and innovation funding priorities, focusing on economic benefits".

Reactions to Roche's appointment were mixed, with commenters generally positive about an appointment being made, and noting the strong agricultural bias of the appointments to the council. Troy Baisden, president of the New Zealand Association of Scientists said of Roche "it is difficult to tell if he’s better at evidence-based policy making or policy-based evidence making".

Office holders
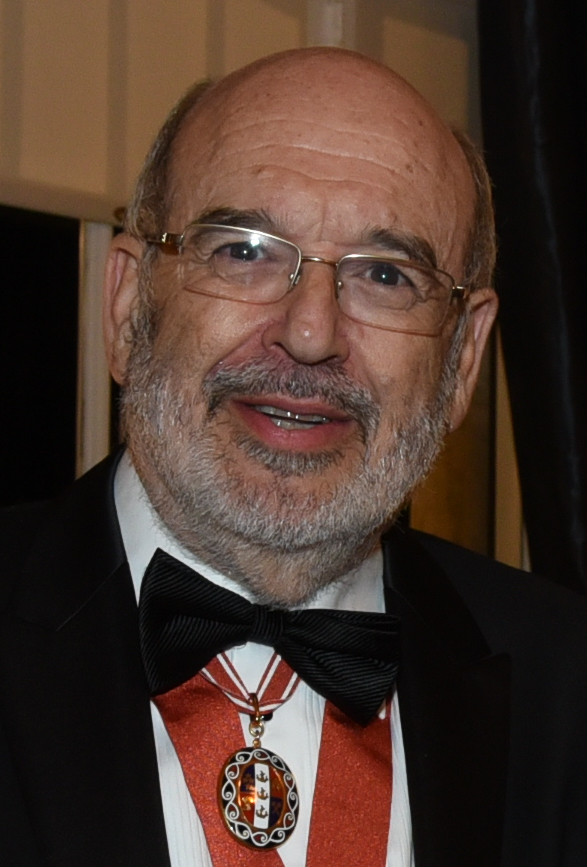
Peter Gluckman

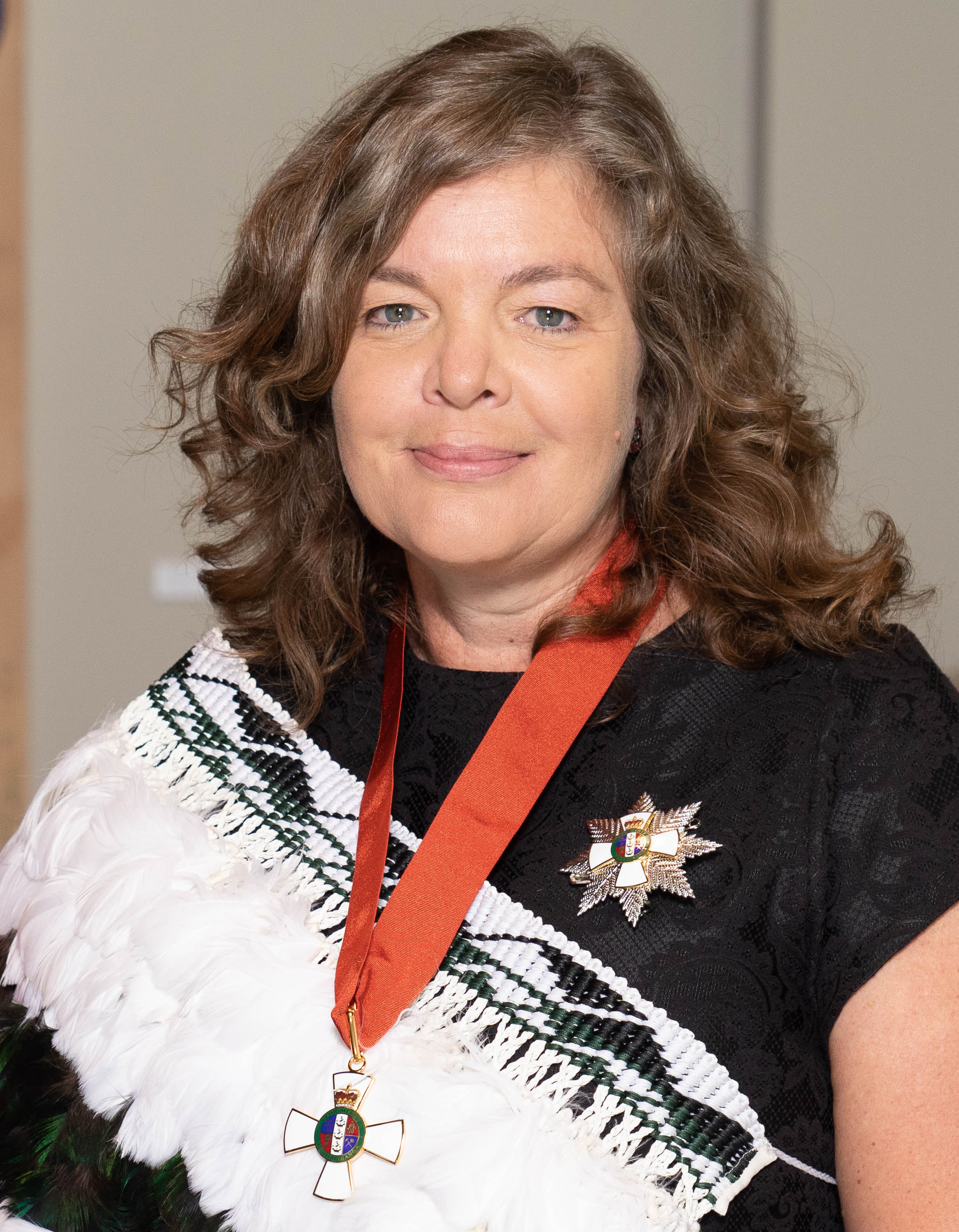
Juliet Gerrard

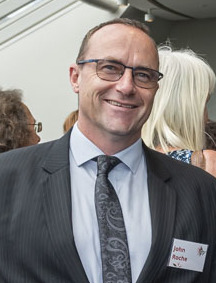
John Roche
