= Donna Rose Addis =

New Zealand psychology academic

- Education: University of Toronto, University of Auckland
- Scientific career
- Thesis: Terms of engagement : investigating the engagement of the hippocampus and related structures during autobiographical memory retrieval in healthy individuals and temporal lobe epilepsy patients. (2005)

Donna Rose Addis is the world's first neuroscientist of Samoan descent and New Zealand psychology academic. She earned the title of full Professor at the University of Auckland before moving to Toronto in 2018 as the Canada 150 Research Chair in Cognitive Neuroscience of Memory and Aging at the University of Toronto and a Senior Scientist at the Rotman Research Institute in Baycrest Hospital. She retains an appointment at Auckland on the Scientific Advisory Board of the Centre for Brain Research in the School of Psychology.

== Academic career ==
Addis went to Aorere College in Auckland, and her bursary marks made her New Zealand's top all-round scholar of Pacific Island descent.

After completing a Bachelor of Arts and Master's degree in Psychology at the University of Auckland, Addis won a commonwealth scholarship to the University of Toronto for a PhD titled 'Terms of engagement: investigating the engagement of the hippocampus and related structures during autobiographical memory retrieval in healthy individuals and temporal lobe epilepsy patients' and a post-doctoral fellowship at Harvard University. She then returned to Auckland, becoming a lecturer at the School of Psychology at the University of Auckland. She rose to full professor in 2016.

Addis's research is on memory, future thinking, depression brain scans, and related areas.

In 2009, Addis won a Prime Minister's Science Prize. She was awarded one of the inaugural Rutherford Discovery Fellowships in 2010.

In 2017, Addis was made a Fellow of the Royal Society of New Zealand.

In 2017, Addis was selected for the Canada 150 program. Her title was Canada 150 Research Chair in Cognitive Neuroscience of Memory and Aging and senior scientist at Baycrest's Rotman Research Institute (RRI) (based in Toronto).

== Early life ==
Addis is a member of the Leger family of Samoa, and the daughter of Brent and Rose Addis. She grew up in South Auckland and attended Aorere College, where she was a part of the choir and Samoan Polyfest group.

== Selected works ==
- Schacter, Daniel L., Donna Rose Addis, and Randy L. Buckner. "Remembering the past to imagine the future: the prospective brain." Nature Reviews Neuroscience 8, no. 9 (2007): 657–661.
- Addis, Donna Rose, Alana T. Wong, and Daniel L. Schacter. "Remembering the past and imagining the future: common and distinct neural substrates during event construction and elaboration." Neuropsychologia 45, no. 7 (2007): 1363–1377.
- Schacter, Daniel L., and Donna Rose Addis. "The cognitive neuroscience of constructive memory: remembering the past and imagining the future." Philosophical transactions of the Royal Society B: biological sciences 362, no. 1481 (2007): 773–786.
- Moscovitch, Morris, R. Shayna Rosenbaum, Asaf Gilboa, Donna Rose Addis, Robyn Westmacott, Cheryl Grady, Mary Pat McAndrews et al. "Functional neuroanatomy of remote episodic, semantic and spatial memory: a unified account based on multiple trace theory." Journal of Anatomy 207, no. 1 (2005): 35–66.
- Schacter, Daniel L., Donna Rose Addis, and Randy L. Buckner. "Episodic simulation of future events." Annals of the New York Academy of Sciences 1124, no. 1 (2008): 39–60.
