= Linet Kwamboka =

Kenyan computer scientist and businesswoman

Linet Kwamboka Nyang'au
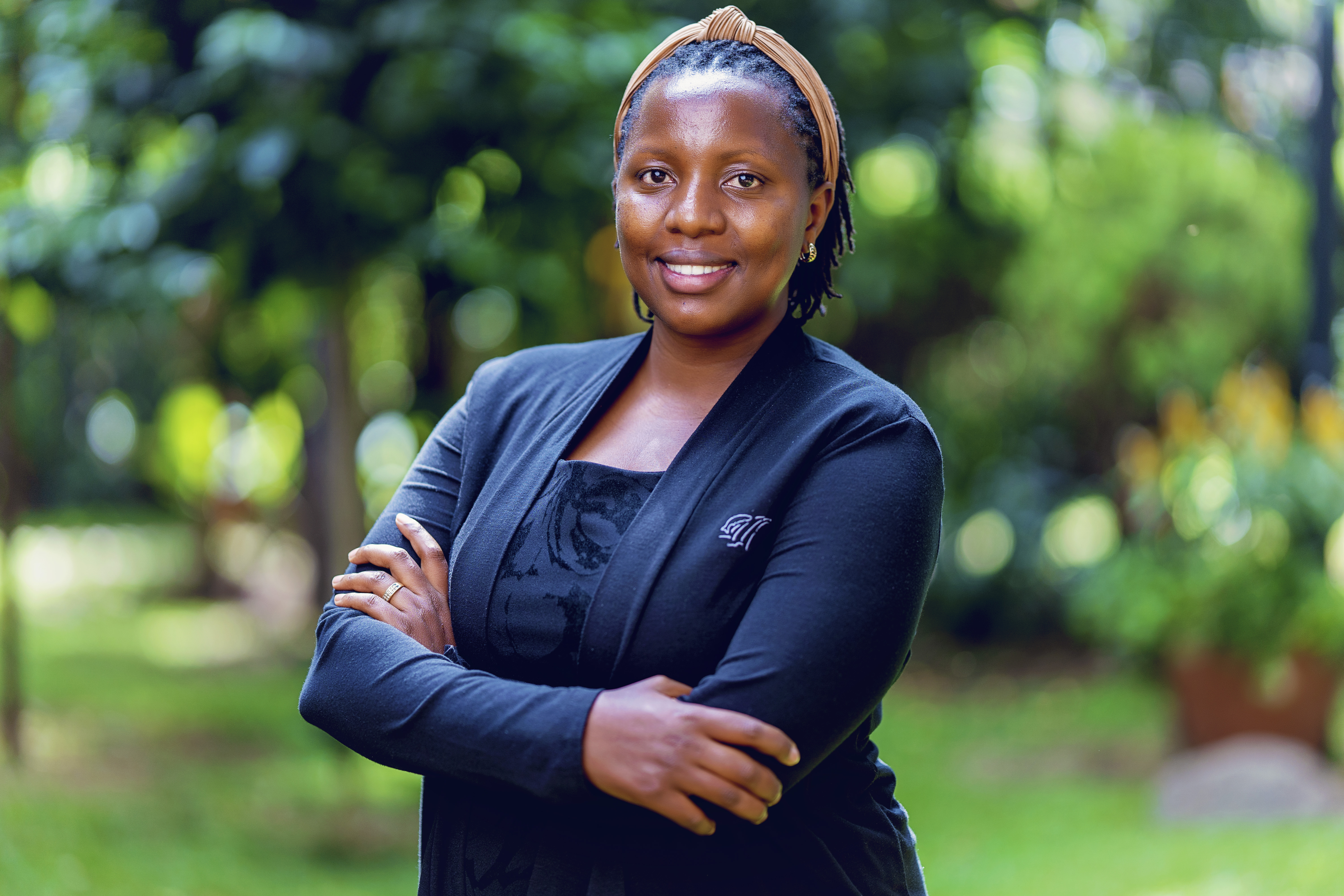
- Born: 1988 (age 37–38); Nyamira County, Kenya
- Education: University of Nairobi; BSc in Computer Science
- Occupations: Computer Scientist & Corporate Executive
- Years active: 2009 — present
- Known for: IT Expertise, Data Science, Artificial Intelligence, Open Data, Data Management and Leadership
- Title: Founder of DataScience Limited, Executive Director - Institute for Development Data

Linet Kwamboka Nyang'au (born c. 1988), is a Kenyan computer scientist and businesswoman, who is the founder and chief executive officer of DataScience Limited, an IT research company.

== Early life ==
She was born in Nyamira County, in the western part of Kenya, circa 1988 to Evelyne Kerubo and Aloys Nyang'au. She is their last-born daughter in a family of eight children. After attending Nyamira Primary School & St. Mathews Academy for Primary School, Butere Girls High School for High School, she was admitted to the University of Nairobi, graduating in 2010, with a Bachelor of Science degree in Computer Science. She has self-taught expertise in geographic information systems (GIS), data mining and analysis.

== Career ==
After university, for the next six years, she led Kenya's Open Data Initiative, nudging the government to make more information open and publicly available. She has worked with the World Bank on the Open Government Partnership for the Government of Kenya. She also worked as a software engineer with Carnegie Mellon University and Stanford University.

In 2013, at the age of 25, Kwamboka founded DataScience Limited. The company, with nine employees in 2015, is involved in data analytics and open-source policy issues.

In 2017, Linet Kwamboka was one of the ten first recipients of the "Mozilla Tech Policy Fellowship". The fellowship, awarded and supported by the Mozilla Foundation, aims "to give people with expertise in government and Internet policy the support and structure they need to continue their work in making the Internet healthy".

In 2020, she joined the UN Foundation's Global Partnership for Sustainable Development data as The Africa Program Manager. She went on to serve as the Senior Program Manager for Data4Now and Senior Manager Innovation for Development at GPSDD.

Linet is currently the executive director at the Institute for Development Data where she is responsible for leading initiatives building Africa's data infrastructure and working with country partners to ensure they have the tools, skills and technical assistance they need to obtain and make use of data that supports decision making.

== Other considerations ==
In August 2018, Linet Kwamboka was named as one of the "100 Most Influential People In Digital Government". The list was compiled by Apolitical, a London, United Kingdom-based non-government global network, which assists public servants find the ideas, people and partners they need to solve the challenges of governing.
