= Peter Gluckman =

New Zealand scientist

Sir Peter Gluckman ONZ KNZM FRS FMedSci FRSNZ
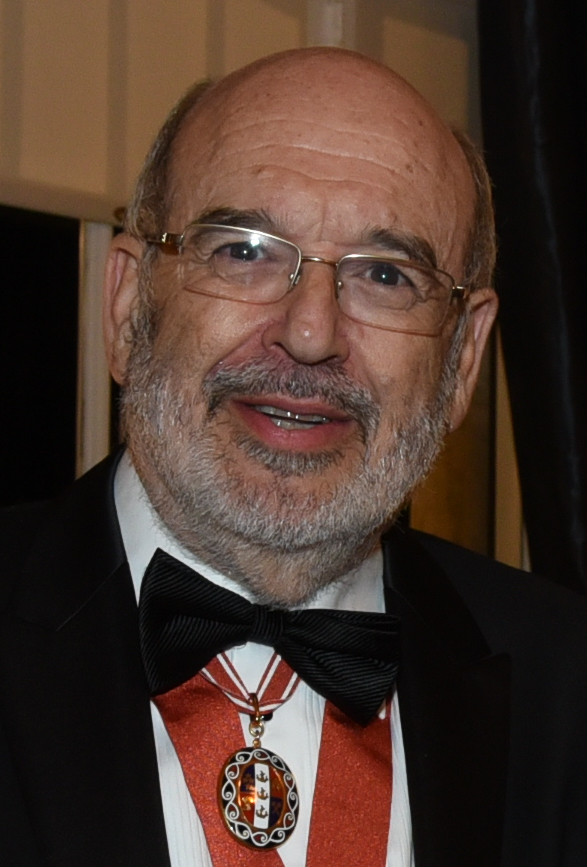
- Gluckman in 2016

1st Prime Minister's Chief Science Advisor
- In office 2009–2018
- Prime Minister: John Key; Bill English; Jacinda Ardern
- Succeeded by: Juliet Gerrard

Personal details
- Born: 8 February 1949 (age 77) Auckland, New Zealand
- Spouse(s): Judith, Lady Gluckman
- Website: https://informedfutures.org
- Scientific career
- Education: University of Otago; University of Auckland
- Known for: Former Director of Liggins Institute and Gravida; Chair, International Network for Government Science Advice
- Fields: Paediatrics and perinatal biology; evolutionary medicine; science policy and diplomacy
- Workplaces: University of Auckland

Sir Peter David Gluckman ONZ KNZM (born 8 February 1949) is a New Zealand scientist. Originally trained as a paediatrician, he served as the inaugural Chief Science Advisor to the New Zealand Prime Minister from 2009 to 2018. He is a founding member and was inaugural chair of the International Network for Government Science Advice, and is president of the International Science Council.

== Scientific career ==
Gluckman was born in Auckland in 1949, the son of Ann Gluckman (née Klippel) and Laurie Gluckman. He attended Auckland Grammar School before studying paediatrics and endocrinology at the University of Otago, gaining an MBChB in 1971 and an MMedSc in 1976 from the University of Auckland. After further training at the University of California, San Francisco, he returned to New Zealand in 1980 to establish a group in perinatal physiology as a career fellow of the Medical Research Council of New Zealand.

In 1988, Gluckman was appointed Professor of Paediatric and Perinatal Biology and was head of the Department of Paediatrics. He obtained a DSc in 1989 from the University of Auckland. From 1992 to 2001 he served as dean of the university's Faculty of Medical and Health Sciences whilst also heading the Research Centre for Developmental Medicine and Biology.

In 2001, Gluckman became the founding director of the Liggins Institute, and, a year later, director of the National Research Centre for Growth and Development (later called 'Gravida: National Centre for Growth and Development'), hosted by the University of Auckland. He stepped down from both positions in mid-2009 to assume his role as the first Chief Science Advisor to the New Zealand Prime Minister.

In 2007 Gluckman was appointed programme director for Growth, Development and Metabolism at the Singapore Institute for Clinical Sciences, where he is currently chief scientific officer. He also holds honorary chairs at National University of Singapore and the University of Southampton. In 2014, he was appointed co-chair of the World Health Organization Commission on Ending Childhood Obesity (ECHO).

Gluckman has made research contributions to the fields of perinatal physiology and biology, developmental neuroscience and neuroprotection, paediatric and experimental endocrinology, as well as at the interface between ecological, developmental and evolutionary biology as applied to human health. He is the only New Zealander elected to the Institute of Medicine of the United States National Academies of Science, and is a Fellow of the Academy of Medical Sciences of the United Kingdom.

== Contributions to science advice and diplomacy ==
In June 2009, Gluckman was appointed as the first Chief Science Advisor to the Prime Minister of New Zealand. This appointment was extended twice to end in June 2018. During this time, Gluckman made national and international contributions to science advice, science policy, and science diplomacy. He established departmental science advisory roles in major departments, and this group has been increasingly used by Government as a formal process of advice on matters relating to evidence and policy. He was given the additional appointment of Special Science Envoy for the Ministry of Foreign Affairs and Trade in 2010 to assist his role in science diplomacy.

Gluckman has explored extensively the principles of science advice through a blog, lectures, and in the scientific press. In 2012 he established and chaired the first formalised regional network of chief science advisors and equivalents of the Asia Pacific Economic Cooperation. He also established the Small Advanced Economies Initiative (SAEI) as a mechanism to bring together policy makers from small, advanced countries where science and innovation are core tools of development, to work collaboratively on shared issues and ideas. In 2013 he was requested by the International Council for Science (ICSU; now the International Science Council) to consider the development of an international network of science advisors. This led Gluckman to host and chair the inaugural Science Advice to Governments Conference, convened by the International Council for Science, in August 2014 in Auckland, New Zealand. It was the first global meeting of high-level science advisors, academies, and academics.

In June 2018, Gluckman stepped down from his role as the Prime Minister's Chief Science Advisor, and was replaced by Juliet Gerrard. On 5 July he was elected to the position of president-elect of the International Science Council at its inaugural meeting in Paris.

In March 2020, Gluckman became the director of the newly established Koi Tū: The Centre for Informed Futures, a University of Auckland Faculty of Arts research centre.

In November 2022, Gluckman criticised the National Party leader Christopher Luxon's proposed Young Offender Military Academies, citing the failure of the previous Fifth National Government's boot camp programme for young offenders. As Chief Science Adviser, Gluckman had published a report in 2018 where he concluded that boot camps and other "scared straight" programmes did not work and instead increased crimes. Instead of boot camps, Gluckman advocated addressing juvenile delinquency and abuse through early intervention programmes, targeted mental health services, and complimentary services focusing on the Māori and Pasifika communities.

In 2024, Gluckman chaired the Science System Advisory Group, which formed by MBIE to advise the government on strengthening New Zealand science, and chaired a similar Ministry of Education group to give advice on the university sector.

== Honours and awards ==
Gluckman is a Fellow of the Royal Society of London, an honour bestowed on just 42 New Zealand-born scientists. In 2001, Gluckman received New Zealand's top science award, the Rutherford Medal.

In 2004, Gluckman was named as The New Zealand Herald New Zealander of the Year, also winning the KEA/NZTE World Class New Zealander Award in 2006.

In the 1997 Queen's Birthday Honours, Gluckman was appointed a Companion of the New Zealand Order of Merit, for services to medicine. He was promoted to Distinguished Companion of the New Zealand Order of Merit, for services to medicine, in the 2008 New Year Honours. In 2009, following the restoration of titular honours by the New Zealand government, he accepted redesignation as a Knight Companion of the New Zealand Order of Merit.

In the 2015 Queen's Birthday Honours, Gluckman was appointed a Member of the Order of New Zealand, the country's highest civilian honour, restricted to 20 living New Zealanders.

Gluckman received the American Association for the Advancement of Science (AAAS) Award for Science Diplomacy, in 2016. In 2019 he was named New Zealand Communicator of the Year by BlacklandPR.

In 2022, he became a laureate of the Asian Scientist 100 by the Asian Scientist.

== Books ==
- Gluckman, Peter; Hanson, Mark (2019), Ingenious: The Unintended Consequences of Human Innovation, Cambridge, MA: Harvard University Press, ISBN 978-0-674-97688-7
- Gluckman, Peter; Beedle, Alan; Buklijas, Tatjana; Low, Felicia; Hanson, Mark (2016), Principles of Evolutionary Medicine (Second ed.), Oxford: Oxford University Press, ISBN 9780199663934
- Gluckman, Peter; Hanson, Mark (2012), Fat, Fate & Disease: Why exercise and diet are not enough, Oxford: Oxford University Press, ISBN 978-0-19-964462-9
- Bateson, Patrick; Gluckman, Peter (2011), Plasticity, Robustness, Development and Evolution, Cambridge: Cambridge University Press, ISBN 978-0-521-73620-6
- Gluckman, Peter; Hanson, Mark (2006), Mismatch: Why our world no longer fits our bodies, Oxford: Oxford University Press, ISBN 978-0-19-280683-3
- Gluckman, Peter; Hanson, Mark (2005), The Fetal Matrix: Evolution, Development and Disease, Cambridge, UK: Cambridge University Press, ISBN 978-0-521-83457-5
