= Lynette Chico =

- Birth name: Lynette Chico
- Born: April 22, 1971 (age 54); Bayamon, Puerto Rican
- Occupation(s): Actress, writer, presenter, models
- Years active: 1987–present

Lynette Chico (born April 22, 1971) is a Puerto Rican fashion model, actress and radio host on 98.5 FM Cadena Salsoul Puerto Rican radio station. She has had parts in many of Puerto Rico's television shows.

== Puerto Rican television ==
- Estudio 69 (she plays "La Chacha", a French maid) with Miguel Morales
- Dame un Break
- No te Duermas
- El Super Show
- Channel 52 V Fifty Two (host of the local music show)

== Calendars ==
She has modeled in many calendars, including "2008 Puerto Rican Sensation".

== Film ==
In 2008 she was cast in a puerto rican movie comedy "Mi Verano Con Amanda". She is part of the cast in Daddy Yankee's upcoming movie Talento de Barrio.

== Personal life ==
Her sister, Leticia Rodriguez, is also an actress.
