= Eluned =

Eluned (from Welsh eilun 'image, idol') is a feminine given name and may refer to:

- Saint Eluned, a 5th-century saint from Brecon, Wales
- Eiluned Lewis (1900–1979), Welsh writer
- Eluned Morgan (author) (1870–1938), Welsh-language author from Patagonia
- Eluned Morgan, Baroness Morgan of Ely (born 1967), Welsh Labour Cabinet Secretary for Health and Social Care and Member of the Senedd for Mid and West Wales
- Eluned Parrott (born 1975), Welsh Liberal Democrat politician
- Eluned Phillips (1914–2009), the only woman to win the bardic crown at the National Eisteddfod of Wales twice
- Eluned Woodford-Williams (1913–1984), British geriatrician

== See also ==
- Luned, a variant of Eluned
