= Barbara Baer Capitman =

American author and preservationist

- Born: Barbara Baer; April 09, 1920; Chicago, Illinois, U.S.
- Died: March 29, 1990 (aged 69); Miami Beach, Florida, U.S.
- Education: New York University
- Occupations: Community activist, author
- Organization: Miami Design Preservation League
- Spouse: William G. Capitman (died 1975)
- Children: Andrew W. Capitman; John A. Capitman

Barbara Capitman (née Baer; April 9, 1920 – March 29, 1990) was a Jewish American community activist and author who led the effort to preserve Miami Beach's historic art deco district and helped create the Miami Design Preservation League. A historical marker as well as a memorial honor her in Miami Beach, Florida.

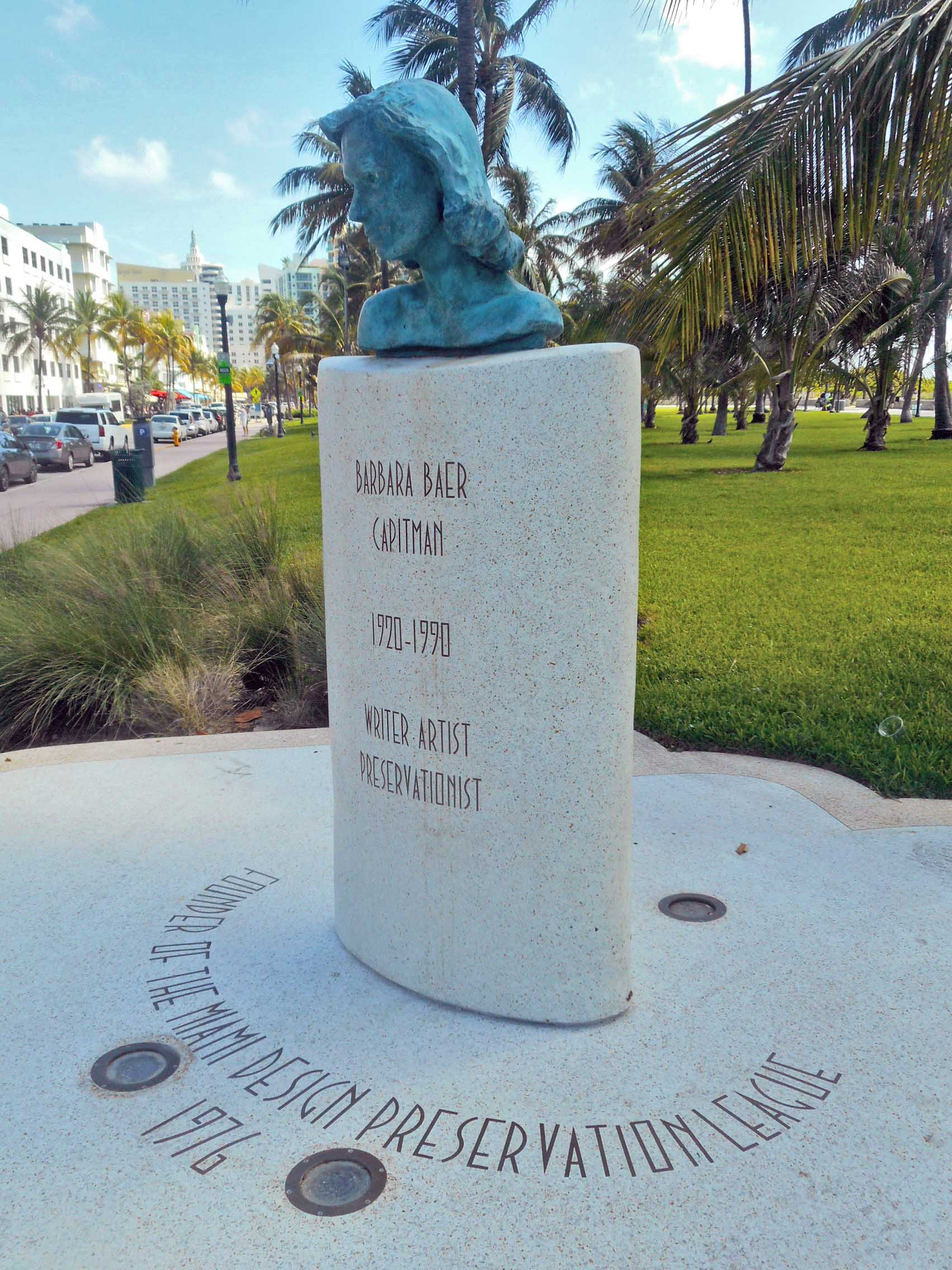
Barbara Baer Capitman Memorial in Lummus Park, Miami Beach, FL.

== Early life ==
Capitman was born in Chicago. Her father was a children's clothing manufacturer and her mother, artist Myrtle Bachrach Baer, was an industrial designer of cars, planes, and appliances. The family moved to Westchester County, New York when Capitman was 3 years old.

She graduated from New York University and worked as a reporter for the Atlantic City Daily World and wrote advertising copy. Her husband, William Capitman, was a market researcher and economist who died in 1975. In 1973, she moved to Miami Beach.

== Historic preservation ==
In 1976, Capitman and a group of historic preservationists formed the Miami Design Preservation League. They began a fight to save the long-neglected art deco buildings in Miami Beach. She lobbied politicians and developers. She and her supporters held candlelight vigils, protest marches and stood in front of bulldozers that were about to demolish buildings. Several of the buildings the group sought to preserve were torn down including the Senator and New Yorker Hotels. However, many more were saved.

The group's efforts were rewarded when Miami Beach's Art Deco District was placed on the National Register of Historic Places in 1979.

The renewed interest in the area led to an economic and cultural rebirth in the city with new investments in hotels, apartments and restaurants. It became a favorite destination of tourists, artists and moviemakers. Capitman's son, Andrew, bought several art deco buildings in the area including the Cardozo Hotel on Ocean Drive. Artists, designers and writers were frequently found in the hotel's café.

== Publications ==
In 1988, Capitman's book, Deco Delights: Preserving the Beauty and Joy of Miami Beach Architecture, was published. Rediscovering Art Deco: A Nationwide Tour of Architectural Delights, which she wrote with Michael D. Kinerk and Dennis W. Wilhelm, was published in 1994.

== Death and tributes ==
Capitman died in Miami Beach at Mount Sinai Medical Center of congestive heart failure. She suffered from diabetes and heart tremors and died after two years of declining health.

At the time of her death, she was working to create the first World Congress on Art Deco. It was to be held during the Miami Design Preservation League's Art Deco Weekend, a festival that drew 420,000 in 1990.

In 1996, 10th Street between Washington Avenue and Ocean Drive in Miami Beach was renamed Barbara Capitman Way.

A memorial featuring a bronze bust of Capitman was dedicated in Miami Beach's Lummus Park during Art Deco Weekend on January 16, 2016. It sits in the park across from the Cardozo Hotel at 13th Street and Ocean Drive.
