= Southern Cross Campus =

- Te Kura Taki o Autahi

Location
- 253 Buckland Road, Mangere East, Auckland; 36.9642°S 174.8165°E

Information
- Type: Composite (Years 1–13)
- Motto: Inā Te Mahi He Rangatira (By Deeds A Chief Is Known)
- Established: 1997
- Ministry of Education Institution no.: 452
- Chairperson: Peter Parussini
- Principal: Dr Samantha Smith
- Enrolment: 1,678 (July 2026)
- Socio-economic decile: 1B
- Website: southerncross.school.nz

Southern Cross Campus (Te Kura Taki o Autahi) is a composite school that caters for students in Years 1–13 in the suburb of Māngere East in Auckland, New Zealand. The school (also referred to as 'SCC', 'The Campus' or 'The Cross') has deep ties to the Mangere East community by providing education, facilities, and programmes for the wider use of the whole school. It is a Māori and Pacific Islands ethnic school, with students of European (Pākehā), Asian, and other ethnicities as a 0.5% minority.

Southern Cross Campus is a fairly new school to Auckland, by being an institute amalgamated with three previous schools in the area: Southern Cross Primary School, Mangere Intermediate School, and Nga Tapuwae College. Southern Cross Campus was founded by Terry Bates (MA (Hons), MPhil (Hons), DipTchg (NZ)), the first Campus Director of the school. It now comprises four schools: Southern Cross Junior School (Primary, Years 1–6), Southern Cross Middle School (Intermediate, Years 7–9), Southern Cross Senior School (Years 9–13), and Te Kura Māori o Ngā Tapuwae (a total-immersion school for Māori-language education, Years 1–13).

In 2019, it was announced that after 13 years as Principal, Mr Robin Staples would retire at the end of Term 1 in the 2020 school year. He was succeeded at the beginning of Term 2 by Dr Samantha Smith, a former associate principal at Massey High School.

== History ==
The formation of the Campus began to take shape after a decision made by the New Zealand government's Ministry of Education concern for the school. Terry Bates, an educational advisor of the Ministry, implemented an idea that the three schools in the area should integrate to create a seamless branch of education to cater for the students of this community. The decision was taken to the Ministry, and was then passed, seeing that this school would be the first of its kind in New Zealand.

After years of planning from the early 1990s, the Board Members of all the schools were disbanded, and a new Board was set to cater for all four schools, chaired by Levuana Tanuvasa. Bill McCook was the Commissioner of the Campus, and his role was to oversee the plans for the new school and to also make sure that the school was meeting government standards and satisfaction. Southern Cross Campus was born in 1995, and officially opened in 1998.

== Te Kura Māori o Ngā Tapuwae ==
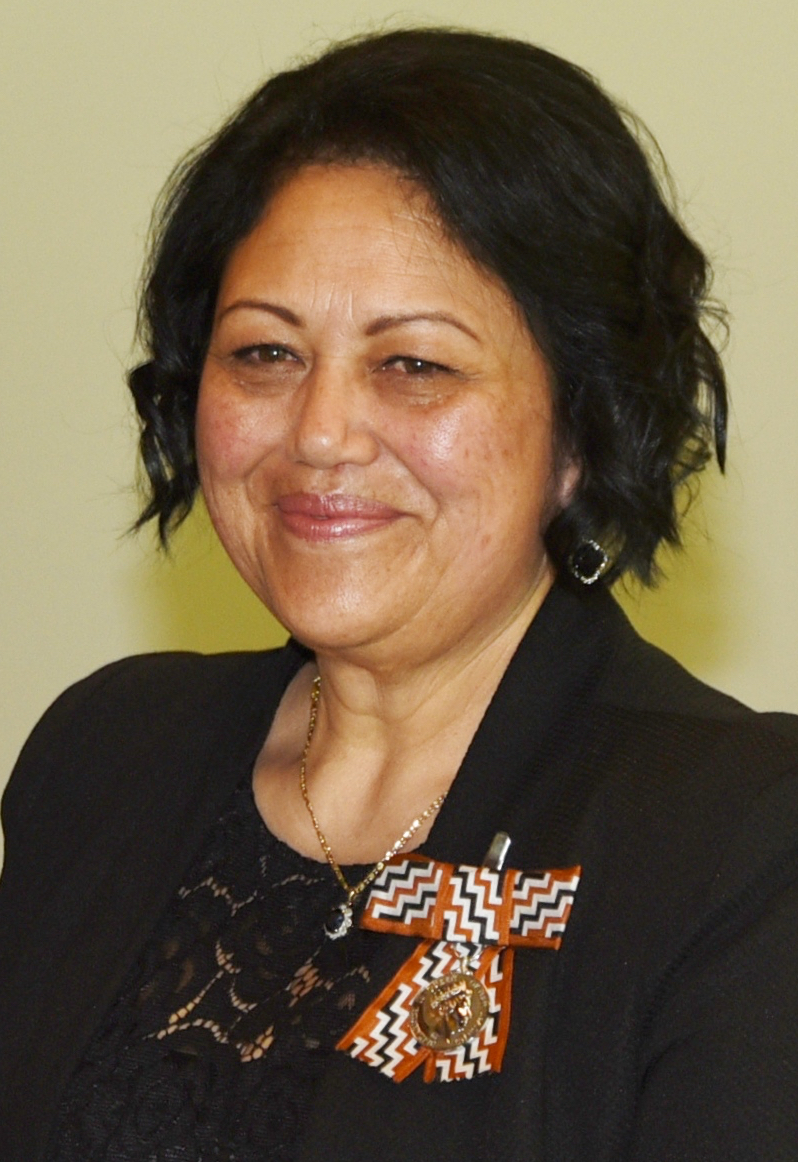
Arihia Stirling, current principal of Te Kura Māori o Ngā Tapuwae

Te Kura Māori o Ngā Tapuwae is a Māori-immersion school for years 1–13. The school emphasises the concept of whanau centred on the marae. The curriculum comprises core learning topics in te reo Maori and culture in addition to standard curricular subjects. The school is supported by the alumni group Nga Tapuwae o Mataoho and the parents committee Te Huarahi Hou. The school originally opened in 1976 as a community secondary school, which included a creche and craft centre. The facilities were used by local churches and the Māori Women's Welfare League, and community social functions were held at the campus' gymnasium. In the mid-1990s, Nga Tapuwae College, Māngere Intermediate and Southern Cross Primary were merged to form the Southern Cross Campus.

Te Kura Māori o Ngā Tapuwae is headed by Arihia Stirling, daughter of founders Pani (Ngati Porou) and Te Kepa Stirling (Te Whanau-a-Apanui, Ngati Porou, Ngai Tahu) and former teacher who has the distinction of being the youngest director in New Zealand at the time of her appointment. In the 2005 New Year Honours, Pani and Te Kepa Stirling were both awarded the Queen's Service Medal for community service. In the 2016 Queen's Birthday Honours, Arihia Stirling was awarded the Queen's Service Medal, for services to education and Māori. In the 2026 New Year Honours, she was appointed a Member of the New Zealand Order of Merit, for services to education and Māori.

== Campus principals ==
	Name	Term
1	Terry Bates	1998–2000
2	Alan Burton	2001
3	John Clark	2002–2006
4	Bill Gavin	2007
5	Robin Staples	2007–2020
6	Samantha Smith	2020–present

== Notable alumni ==
- Valerie Adams – Olympic athlete and shot put world champion
- Ken Maumalo – rugby league player
- Patrick Herbert – rugby league player
- Leka Halasima – rugby league player
