= Shari Gallop =

New Zealand marine scientist

Shari L. Gallop is a marine environmental scientist and an honorary academic at the University of Waikato, New Zealand. Her work focuses on coastal processes and the coastal impacts of climate change. In 2020 she was awarded the L’Oréal/UNESCO For Women in Science Award for her research into restoring estuaries so that they would be resilient to the effects of climate change.

== Biography ==
Gallop grew up in the Bay of Plenty region; she was born in Whakatāne and raised in Kawerau and Manawahe. She is New Zealand Māori, of Ngāti Maru (on her father's side) and Te Rarawa (on her mother's side) iwi. Gallop works at Pattle Delamore Partners in Turanga, and is an honorary academic at the University of Waikato.

She attended Edgecumbe College and the University of Waikato, where she completed a bachelor's and a master's degree in science. Her thesis was on rip currents at Tairua and Muriwai beaches. She completed a PhD at the University of Western Australia in Perth, Australia, studying rocky reefs and their impact on coastal erosion and stability. After graduation, she lectured and carried out research at the University of Southampton in the United Kingdom and Macquarie University in Sydney, Australia. She was a co-leader of the Coastal Challenge research group at the Resilience to Nature's Challenges National Science Challenge.

In 2020, Gallop was awarded the L’Oréal/UNESCO For Women in Science Award for her research into restoring estuaries so that they would be resilient in the face of climate change. Gallop said the issue was increasingly relevant as estuaries are especially vulnerable to climate change, and she was interested in why some restoration efforts were successful and others were not.

In 2025, Gallop was part of a team that was awarded the New Zealand Coastal Society's eCoast Sustainability Award. The award recognised the establishment of the Tangata Whenua Climate Adaptation Network.
