= Cristina Cleghorn =

New Zealand public health researcher

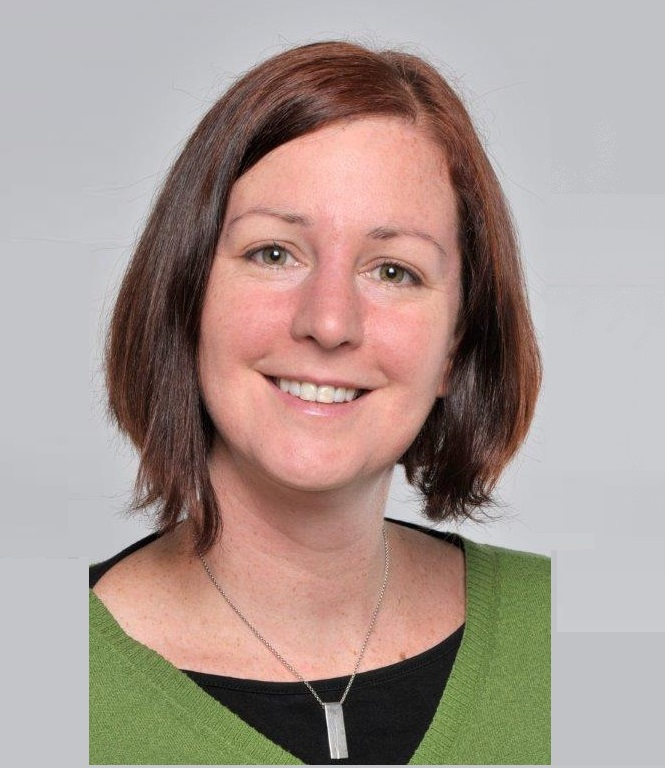
- Education: University of Leeds
- Scientific career
- Fields: Human nutrition; public health
- Workplaces: University of Otago
- Thesis: Relationships between agrobiodiversity, dietary diversity and nutritional status in Tanzania (2014)
- Doctoral advisor: Janet Cade; Darren Dahly; Susannah Sallu

Christine Liana Cleghorn, known as Cristina Cleghorn, is a New Zealand public health and nutrition researcher, and as of 2023 is an academic at the University of Otago in the Department of Public Health.

== Academic career ==
Cleghorn studied at the University of Otago, graduating with a Bachelor of Science degree in 2000, and a Master of Science degree with distinction in human nutrition in 2002.

After a research assistantship at the University of Otago's Department of Human Nutrition, Cleghorn entered a PhD programme at Leeds University's School of Food Science and Nutrition in 2009, graduating with a 2014 thesis titled Relationships between agrobiodiversity, dietary diversity and nutritional status in Tanzania. She then joined the Department of Public Health at the University of Otago as a nutrition researcher.

Cleghorn's research is focussed on the prevention of chronic disease though diet (ideally sustainable diets), exercise, and reducing tobacco use. She pointed out in 2018 that processed and red meat increased the risk of colorectal cancer, type 2 diabetes, and cardiovascular disease, and that transitioning to a more plant-based diet could reduce global mortality by 6–10 per cent. Cleghorn more recently has studied the greenhouse gas emissions of New Zealand dietary interventions, and modelled the effect of replacing meat with alternative protein sources. From 2020 to 2024 she led a project on a sustainable diet for New Zealand health and the climate, funded by Healthier Lives National Science Challenge. Her work on the quantification of greenhouse gases began with the Burden of Disease Epidemiology, Equity and Cost-Effectiveness Programme (BODE^{3}), and continued with the Simulation Health Modelling Network (SiHMNet), where she is a senior research fellow.

In 2025 a team led by Cleghorn published a review of the Health Star Rating system applied to New Zealand food packaging. They found that the voluntary ratings, applied by manufacturers to themselves, had had very little effect on public health, and recommended the scheme instead be made mandatory.

In December 2025 Cleghorn was appointed as research associate professor at the University of Otago, effective from 1 February 2026.

== Selected works ==
- Andrew N Reynolds; Cliona Ni Mhurchu; Zi-Yi Kok; Christine Cleghorn (February 2023). "The neglected potential of red and processed meat replacement with alternative protein sources: Simulation modelling and systematic review". EClinicalMedicine. 56 101774. doi:10.1016/j.eclinm.2022.101774. ISSN 2589-5370. PMC 9772543. PMID 36567793. Wikidata Q121269718.
- Richard W. McDowell; Alexander Herzig; Tony J. van der Weerden; Christine Cleghorn; William Kaye-Blake (23 November 2022). "Growing for good: producing a healthy, low greenhouse gas and water quality footprint diet in Aotearoa, New Zealand". Journal of the Royal Society of New Zealand: 1–25. doi:10.1080/03036758.2022.2137532. ISSN 0303-6758. Wikidata Q121269719.
- Cleghorn, Christine; Mulder, Ingrid; Macmillan, Alex; Mizdrak, Anja; Drew, Jonathan; Nghiem, Nhung; Blakely, Tony; Mhurchu, Cliona Ni (2022). "Can a Greenhouse Gas Emissions Tax on Food also be Healthy and Equitable? A Systemised Review and Modelling Study from Aotearoa New Zealand". International Journal of Environmental Research and Public Health. 19 (8): 4421. doi:10.3390/ijerph19084421. medRxiv 10.1101/2022.02.15.22271015. PMC 9031643.
- Christine L Cleghorn; Tony Blakely; Giorgi Kvizhinadze; Frederieke S van der Deen; Nhung Nghiem; Linda J Cobiac; Nick Wilson (16 November 2017). "Impact of increasing tobacco taxes on working-age adults: short-term health gain, health equity and cost savings". Tobacco Control. 27 (e2): e167–e170. doi:10.1136/tobaccocontrol-2017-053914. ISSN 0964-4563. PMID 29146589. Wikidata Q47582596.
- Christine L Cleghorn; Roger A Harrison; Joan K Ransley; Shan Wilkinson; James Thomas; Janet E Cade (16 May 2016). "Can a dietary quality score derived from a short-form FFQ assess dietary quality in UK adult population surveys?". Public Health Nutrition. 19 (16): 2915–2923. doi:10.1017/s1368980016001099. ISSN 1368-9800. PMID 27181696. Wikidata Q40753142.
