= Pat Suggate =

New Zealand geologist

Pat Suggate CNZM
- Born: Richard Patrick Suggate; 17 March 1922; Islington, London, England
- Died: 16 June 2016 (aged 94); Wellington, New Zealand
- Spouse: Olwyn Daphne Reynolds (m. 1944; died 2012)
- Relatives: Eugenie Sage (daughter-in-law)
- Scientific career
- Education: University of Oxford
- Awards: FRSNZ (1963); Hutton Medal (1983); McKay Hammer (2001); CNZM (2003)
- Fields: Geology
- Workplaces: New Zealand Geological Survey

Richard Patrick Suggate CNZM (17 March 1922 – 16 June 2016) was a New Zealand geologist, known for his research into coal properties and coal rank, and into the advances and retreats of New Zealand's glaciers. From 1974 to 1986, he served as director of the New Zealand Geological Survey.

== Early life and family ==
Born in Islington, London, England, on 17 March 1922, Suggate was the son of Leonard Suggate and Florence Burden. He was educated at the University of Oxford, graduating with a Master of Arts. He married Olwyn Daphne Reynolds in London on 1 November 1944. Suggate served with the Royal Army Ordnance Corps as a lieutenant during World War II.

== Career ==
Emigrating to New Zealand in 1947, Suggate joined the New Zealand Geological Survey. Initially based in Greymouth, he worked with Harold Wellman to investigate the coal resources around Murchison. He went on to make major contributions to geological mapping in New Zealand, and to the effect of coal rank on its properties. He showed how peat is transformed into coal when buried in sedimentary basins, and showed that coal and organic sediments are the origin of gas and oil fields in New Zealand, and not marine deposits as previously believed.

In 1961, Suggate was awarded a Doctor of Science degree by the University of New Zealand through Canterbury University College on the basis of papers submitted.

Suggate rose to become director of the New Zealand Geological Survey in 1974, retiring in 1986. However, he continued to be an active researcher, and developed the Suggate rank scheme, which is used internationally by oil exploration companies to measure the oil and gas potential of sedimentary rocks. In this period, he also completed a number of geological mapping projects, and made a significant contribution to research on the advance and retreat of glaciers near Hokitika.

Suggate died in Wellington on 16 June 2016.

== Honours and awards ==
Suggate was elected a Fellow of the Royal Society of New Zealand in 1963. In 1983 he was awarded the Hutton Medal by the Royal Society of New Zealand, and in 2001 he received the McKay Hammer from the Geological Society of New Zealand, for the most outstanding published research on New Zealand geology over the preceding three years.

In the 2003 New Year Honours, Suggate was appointed a Companion of the New Zealand Order of Merit for services to geology.
