= Our Land and Water =

Primary-production research programme in New Zealand (2016–2024)

- Our Land and Water National Science Challenge
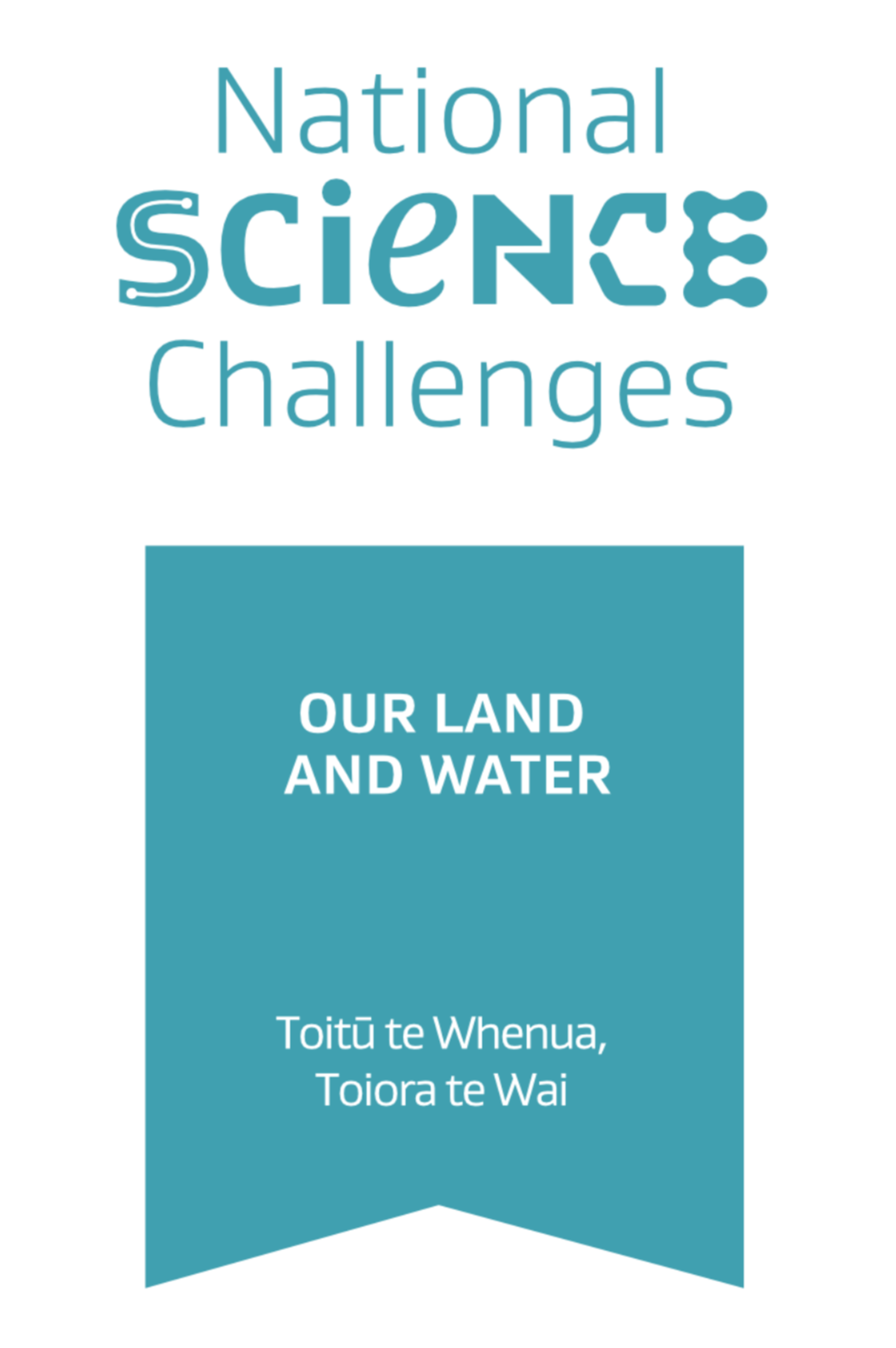
- Established: 20165
- Type: Research programme
- Location: New Zealand
- Director: Jenny Webster-Brown
- Budget: $96.9 m NZD
- Funding: MBIE
- Website: ourlandandwater.nz

Our Land and Water (Māori: Toitū te Whenua, Toiora te Wai) was one of New Zealand's eleven collaborative research programmes known as National Science Challenges. Running from 2016 to 2024, the focus of Our Land and Water (OLW) research was enhancing the productivity of New Zealand farms while improving the quality of land and water.

== Establishment and governance ==
The New Zealand Government agreed in August 2012 to fund National Science Challenges: large multi-year collaborative research programmes that would address critical issues in New Zealand's future. The funding criteria were set out in January 2014, with proposals assessed by a Science Board within the Ministry of Business, Innovation, and Employment (MBIE).

After a planning phase in 2014, MBIE approved the Crown Research Institute AgResearch as the host institution. OLW was formally launched on 26 January 2016 by the Minister for Science and Innovation Steven Joyce; its inaugural director was Ken Taylor, and Chief Scientist was Richard McDowell. The Māori name of Our Land and Water, Toitū te Whenua (let the land's permanence remain intact) Toiora te Wai (let water abound), was an adaptation of the whakataukī (proverb) "Toitū te whenua, whatungarongaro te tangata" (land is permanent, while people come and go).

OLW was hosted by AgResearch, with twelve other New Zealand research partners including the six other Crown Research Institutes (GNS Science, Scion, ESR, Landcare Research, NIWA, and Plant & Food Research), Lincoln Agritech, and four universities: the University of Auckland, Massey University, Lincoln University, and the University of Waikato. It was the largest of the Science Challenges at launch, with an initial budget of $96.9 million over 8 years, though it was second in funding to the Science for Technological Innovation Challenge with its $106 million budget.

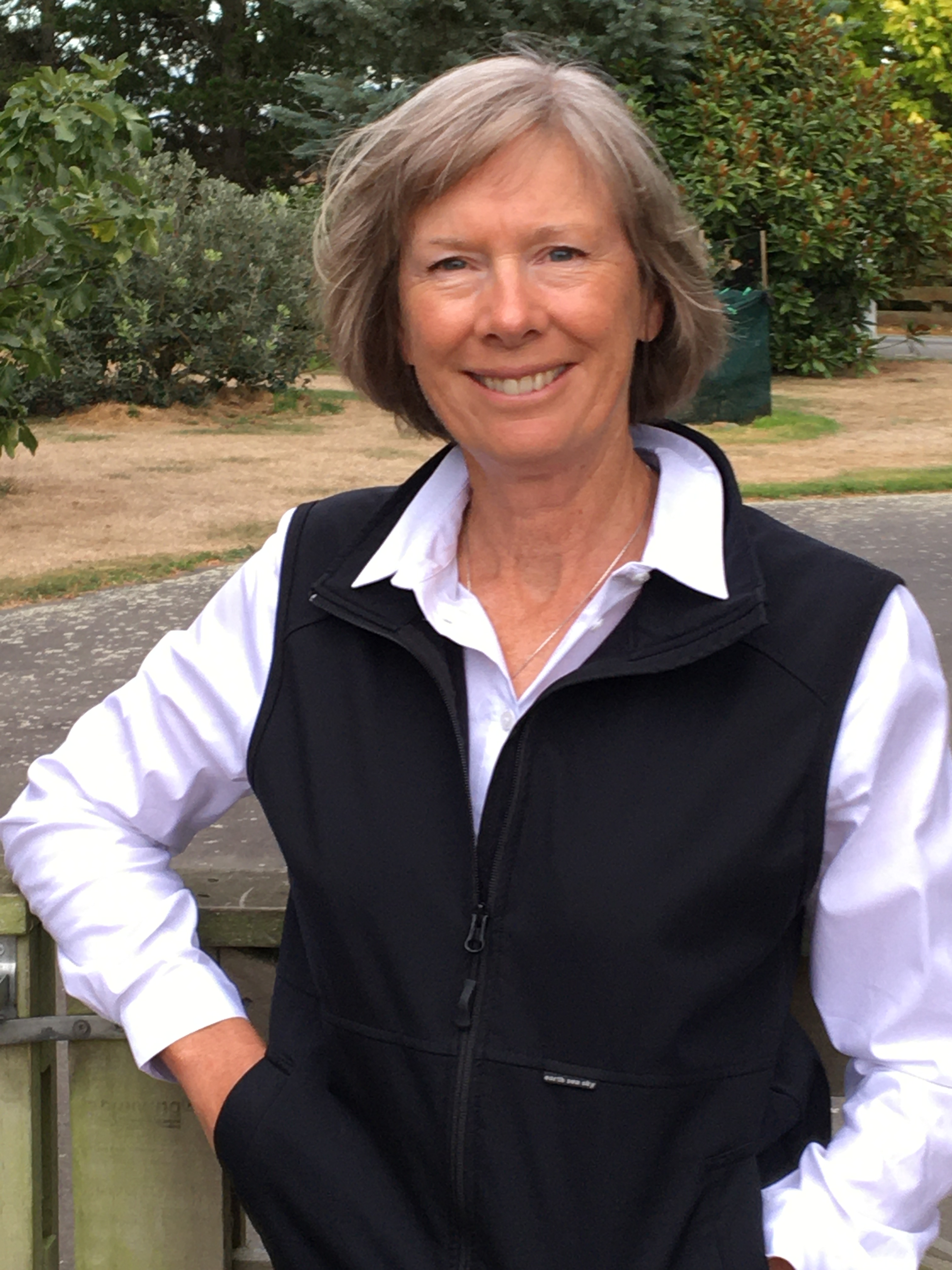
Jenny Webster-Brown

In December 2015, after feedback from MBIE's Science Board, the OLW Directorate sought advice from Ray Collins at the University of Queensland on incorporating value chain management into the proposed research programme. At the time of receiving its second tranche of funding in November 2018, the Challenge had 31 research projects completed or in progress, and had produced 43 journal articles. By mid-2019, OLW was partnered with 16 research organisations, and was coordinating the work of around 160 scientists and 100 collaborating organisations.

In March 2020, Ken Taylor retired and Jenny Webster-Brown was appointed director of OLW. The OLW Challenge formally ended in June 2024.

== Research ==
OLW's research focus was on three connected areas: Future Landscapes, encouraging a diverse 'mosaic' of land use that is both more resilient and has better soil and water quality; Incentives for Change, making higher-value exports that reward sustainable practices; and Pathways to Transition, speeding up the ability of farmers and growers to adopt new research and technology.

=== Future Landscapes ===
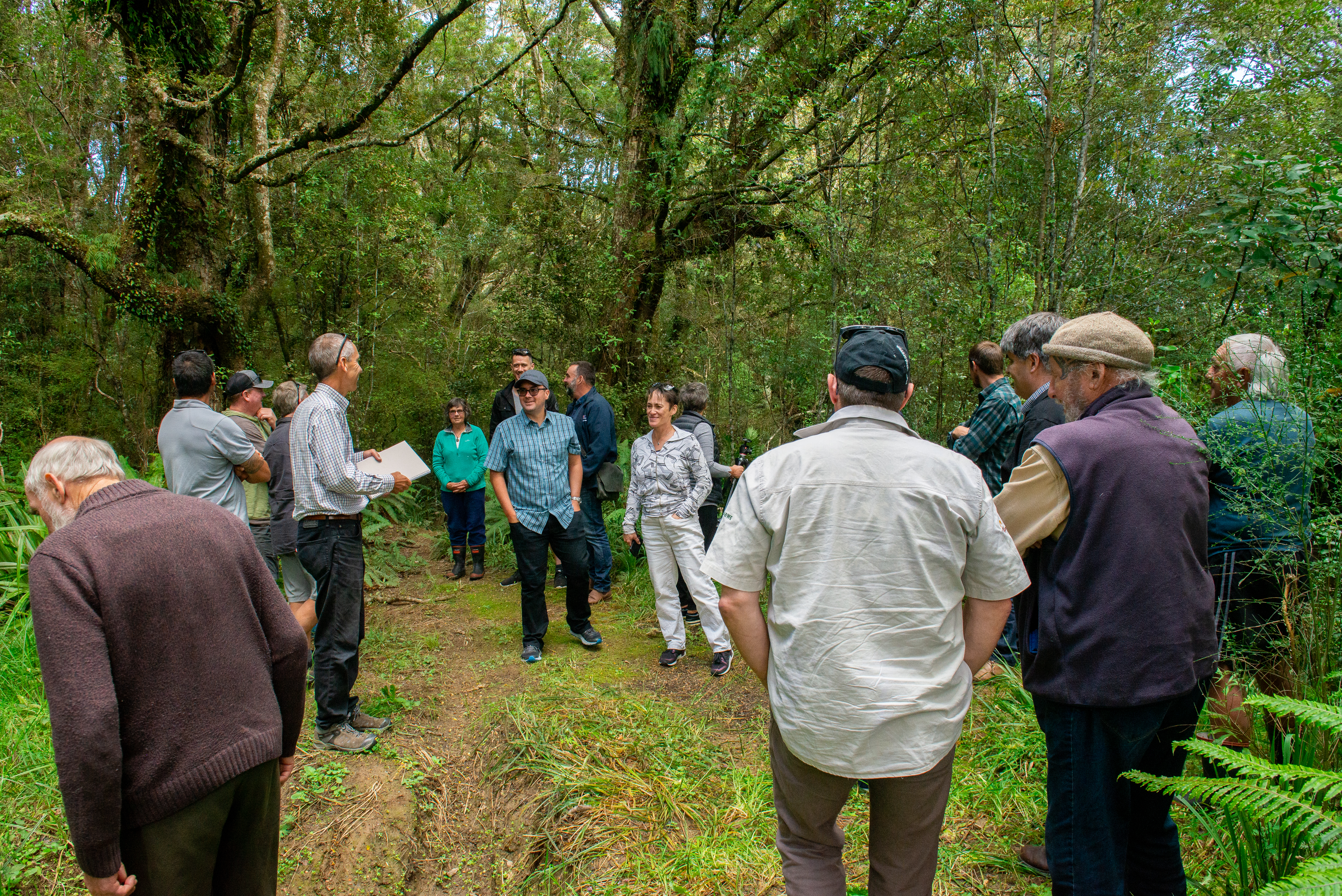
Collective catchment management workshop, Pourakino, Southland

In 2020, New Zealand's National Policy Statement for Freshwater Management set safe "bottom line" levels for the agricultural pollutants nitrogen, phosphorus, sediment and E. coli in rivers, lakes, and estuaries. An OLW study led by Ton Snelder examined these levels throughout the country, at 850 long-term water monitoring sites across 650,000 river segments, 961 lakes and 419 estuaries. It found that almost every region in New Zealand exceeded bottom line levels in one or more contaminants. More than three quarters of land in the country was contributing too much E. coli to fresh water, and agricultural land had excessive nitrogen loads, with Southland needing to reduce its nitrate pollution by 41 percent and Canterbury by 44 percent. The research was turned into a brief for regional councils to help with contaminant reduction planning.

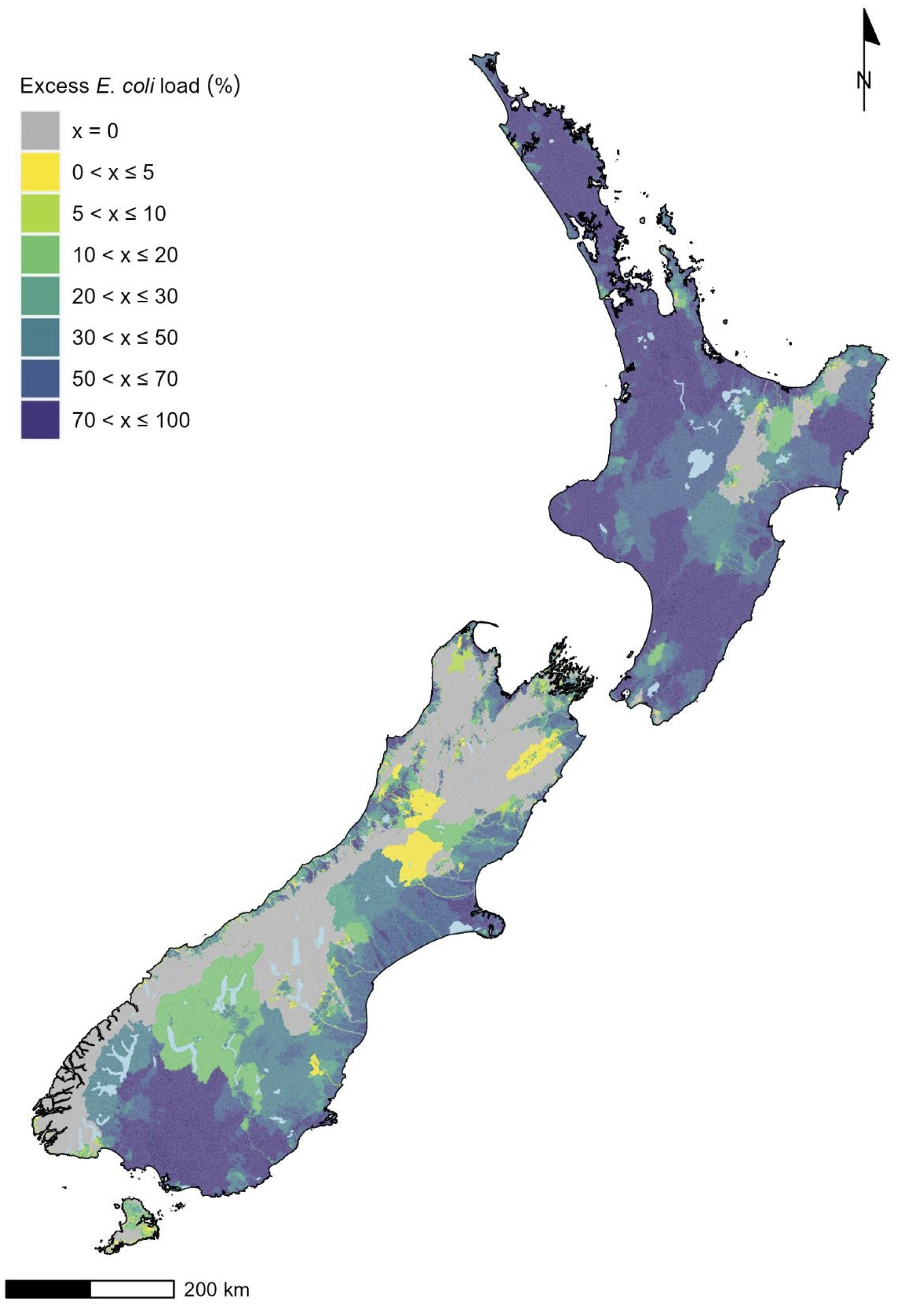
Excess loads of E. coli in New Zealand fresh water, from Snelder et al. (2023)

A project led by Richard McDowell examined whether fencing livestock out of large (high-order) streams would reduce contamination by nitrogen, phosphorus, sediment, and E. coli. Under New Zealand regulations, cattle, pigs, and farmed deer must be excluded from waterways over 1 m wide, with a fence set back at least 3 m. However they discovered that smaller streams, exempt from fencing regulations, contributed 77% of the national water contamination load—so fencing large streams alone would not be sufficient to improve water quality. This study won the Journal of Environmental Quality Paper of the Year award for 2019.

OLW research showed that on farms with variable soil types using variable-rate irrigation could cut the leaching of nitrogen and phosphate by 70–80%. This underlined the potential environmental benefits of precision irrigation. Another project, Stories and Flows, was one of the largest undertaken by OLW, with a budget of $3.2 million. Its goal was to fine tune land use on a farm to match the impact of different activities. McDowell led a project on the use of phosphorus in global agriculture, revealing that the world's phosphorus reserves were sufficient to last over 500 years if used correctly, but that three quarters of farmed soils were phosphorus-deficient, while farmers in other areas were over-applying it causing runoff and eutrophication. In New Zealand, phosphorus concentrations in waterways were decreasing, another OLW-funded study found, in response to strategies like fencing off and planting alongside farm streams and improved practices in fertiliser application since the 1990s.

In a partnership with Healthier Lives, OLW researchers examined agricultural scenarios aimed at orptimising a healthy diet while minimising nitrate and phosphate water pollution. They suggested that New Zealand could meet its environmental goals by changing land use in parts of the country that would otherwise be unable to meet water-quality targets, for example as a result of agricultural contamination. This research was included in a Ministerial briefing to support a New Zealand National Food Strategy.

A global survey of periphyton (algal) in 1406 large rivers, led by Rich McDowell, predicted 31% of the world's land mass had catchments susceptible to high levels of peripyton growth. Over three quarters of this area was agricultural catchments in North and South America and Europe, totalling 1.7 billion people, polluted by phosphate runoff. The remainder periphyton growth was caused by nitrate pollution in parts of North Africa, the Middle East, and India.

One tool developed by the Challenge was a $2.8 million research project using national environmental datasets to develop a land classification system that could inform both central and local government policy decisions. Other tools included a guide for apple and grape growers to predicting the risk of the diseases apple fire blight, grape powdery mildew and grape botrytis with climate change, and a free crop data repository, called the Data Supermarket, storing information on crop production potential of land throughout New Zealand along with climate and economic data.

=== Incentives for Change ===
An OLW-funded research project into the effect of the European Union Green Deal on New Zealand agricultural exports revealed significant challenges ahead. The EU plan to make its agriculture more sustainable included the widespread adoption of organic farming and a ban on the importation of products with residues of pests and agricultural chemicals. New Zealand at the time had no National Organic Standard comparable with the EU, and banned only 27 chemicals and pesticides, compared with the EU's 195. Without policy change, this could reduce access to the EU market for New Zealand exporters.

Paul Dalziel led a project on value chains in New Zealand agricultural exports, examining the steps from producer to final retailer that could increase the value of exports. A variety of export markets were examined, including New Zealand beef and sauvignon blanc in California, and yogurt and kiwifruit in Shanghai. Consumers of New Zealand products overseas were found to be willing to pay a premium for sustainably-produced and organic produce, which could reward farmers complying with new water and climate regulations. However, unlike other small advanced economies, New Zealand's distance from world markets pose unique challenges, and an OLW study found that this sort of geographic isolation is often not fully taken into account by policy advisors when developing economic strategy.

One project on food cultures within New Zealand linked sustainable food production with dietary recommendations, examing how people made food choices. For example, a study on school meal programmes found that, while essential for alleviating food poverty, they could not be based solely on nutritional content, but needed to include culturally-relevant dishes. The most successful programmes integrated food history, cooking, and gardening into the curriculum.

=== Pathways to Transition ===
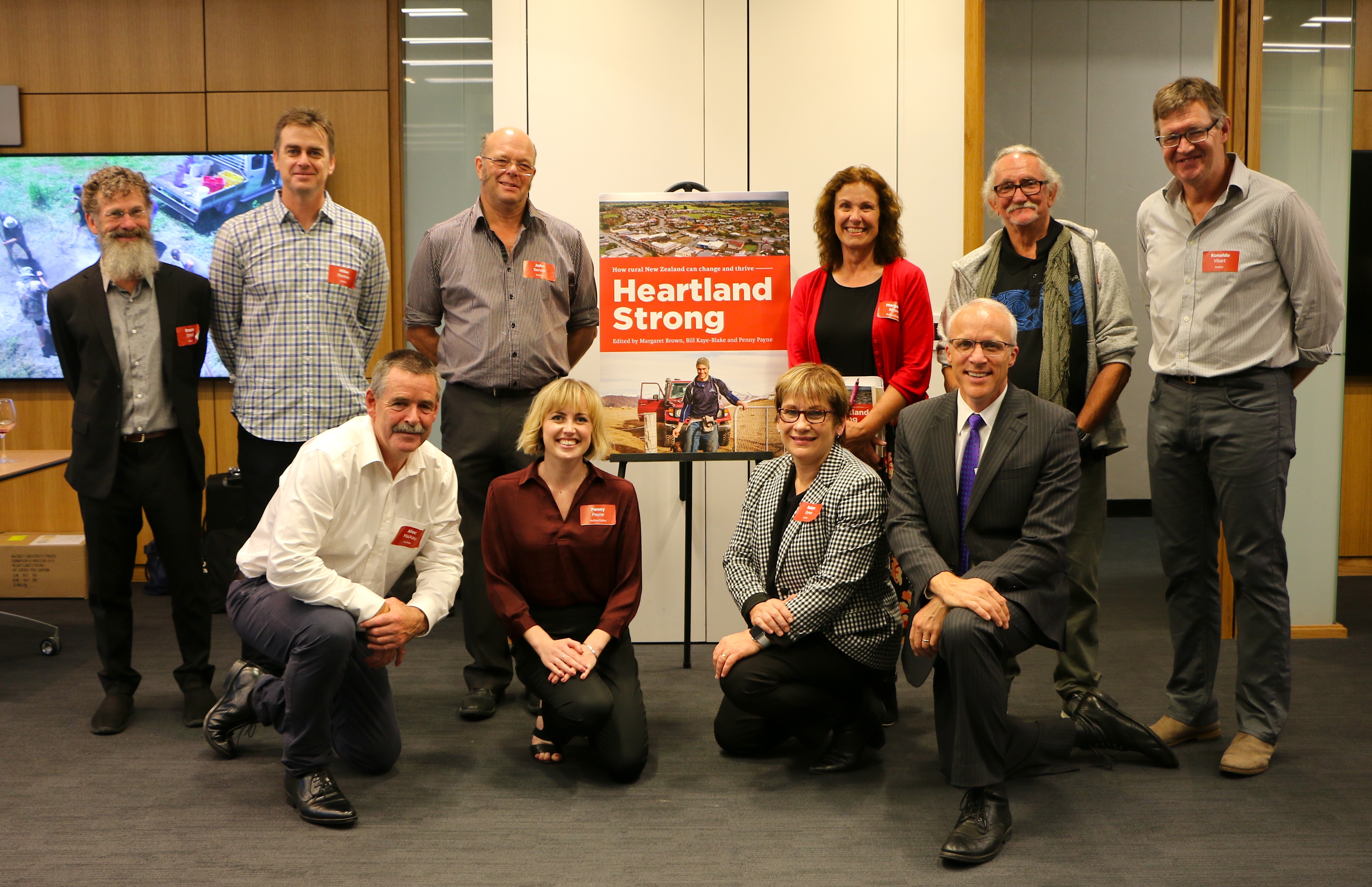
Book launch for Heartland Strong in 2019

Storying Kaitiakitanga was a research project that worked with Māori agribusinesses who were producing food using traditional practices of kaitiakitanga (guardianship or responsibility). Similar to an ecosystem approach in Western science, this treats farming and the environment as parts of the same system.

The AgResearch research programme Resilient Rural Communities in collaboration with OLW studied rural resilence, the importance of social relationships in networks, and the future of New Zealand's rural communities, leading to the publication of the book Heartland Strong. Significant threats to resilence were climate change, the disconnect between urban and rural populations, and increased centralisation of decision-making and resource in cities. This research went on to influence government policies such as Rural Proofing and Rural Hubs—in which MPI established 16 rural community hubs over 2019–21.

One project extrapolated recent land-use change into the future in the Ashburton region, which rapidly transitioned from sheep and grain-growing to dairy farming in the early 2000s. This meant a large investment in dairy buildings, half of which will be needing replacement in the 2040s; at the same time 78 per cent of all water use consents, including those by all three irrigation companies in the area, will have expired. Researchers examined what sort of land-use changes that might entail under the 2020 National Policy Statement for Fresh Water Management and future climate change.
