= Sally Davenport =

New Zealand academic specializing in management studies

Sally Jane Davenport
- Education: Victoria University of Wellington
- Scientific career
- Fields: Business incubators
- Workplaces: Victoria University of Wellington
- Thesis: N M R Studies of Coal (1985)

Sally Jane Davenport MNZM is an Aotearoa-New Zealand academic and a full professor at the Victoria University of Wellington.

== Academic career ==
Professor Davenport completed her PhD in 1985 at Victoria University of Wellington, before taking up a post-doctorate at the University of Oxford. On her return to New Zealand, Davenport joined the staff at Victoria University of Wellington, rising to full professor.

Davenport was appointed to the New Zealand Productivity Commission in 2011 and reappointed in 2014.

In 2018, Davenport was made a Member of the New Zealand Order of Merit.

She was Director of the Science for Technological Innovation (SfTI), a 10-year (2014–2024) National Science Challenge with the mission to enhance the capacity of New Zealand to use physical sciences and engineering for economic growth and prosperity.

== Selected works ==
- Davenport, Sally, John Davies, and Charlotte Grimes. "Collaborative research programmes: building trust from difference." Technovation 19, no. 1 (1998): 31–40.
- Davenport, Sally. "Exploring the role of proximity in SME knowledge-acquisition." Research policy 34, no. 5 (2005): 683–701.
- Davenport, Sally, and Shirley Leitch. "Circuits of power in practice: Strategic ambiguity as delegation of authority." Organization Studies 26, no. 11 (2005): 1603–1623.
- Leitch, Shirley, & Sally Davenport. (2011). Corporate identity as an enabler and constraint on the pursuit of corporate objectives. European Journal of Marketing. 45 (9/10), 1501 – 1520.
- Davenport, Sally. & Shirley Leitch. (2009) We Are What We Grow: The Discursive Strategies of Pro- and Anti-GE Factions Regarding the Future of Agriculture in New Zealand. European Planning Studies, 17(7), 943-961.
- Davenport, Sally. "Panic and panacea: brain drain and science and technology human capital policy." Research policy 33, no. 4 (2004): 617–630.
- Davenport, Sally, and David Bibby. "Rethinking a national innovation system: The small country as' SME'." Technology Analysis & Strategic Management 11, no. 3 (1999): 431–462.
