= Healthier Lives =

Collaborative public health research programme in New Zealand (2015–2024)

- Healthier Lives – He Oranga Hauora
- Established: 2015
- Dissolved: 2024
- Type: Research programme
- Location: New Zealand
- Director: Jim Mann
- Budget: $31.26 m NZD
- Funding: MBIE
- Website: healthierlives.co.nz

Healthier Lives – He Oranga Hauora was one of New Zealand's eleven collaborative research programmes known as National Science Challenges. Running from 2015 to 2024, the focus of Healthier Lives National Science Challenge research was cancer, cardiovascular disease, obesity, and diabetes in the New Zealand population, encompassing prevention, treatment, and the reduction of health inequity, and including precision medicine techniques, and culturally-centred health programmes for Māori and Pasifika.

== Establishment and governance ==
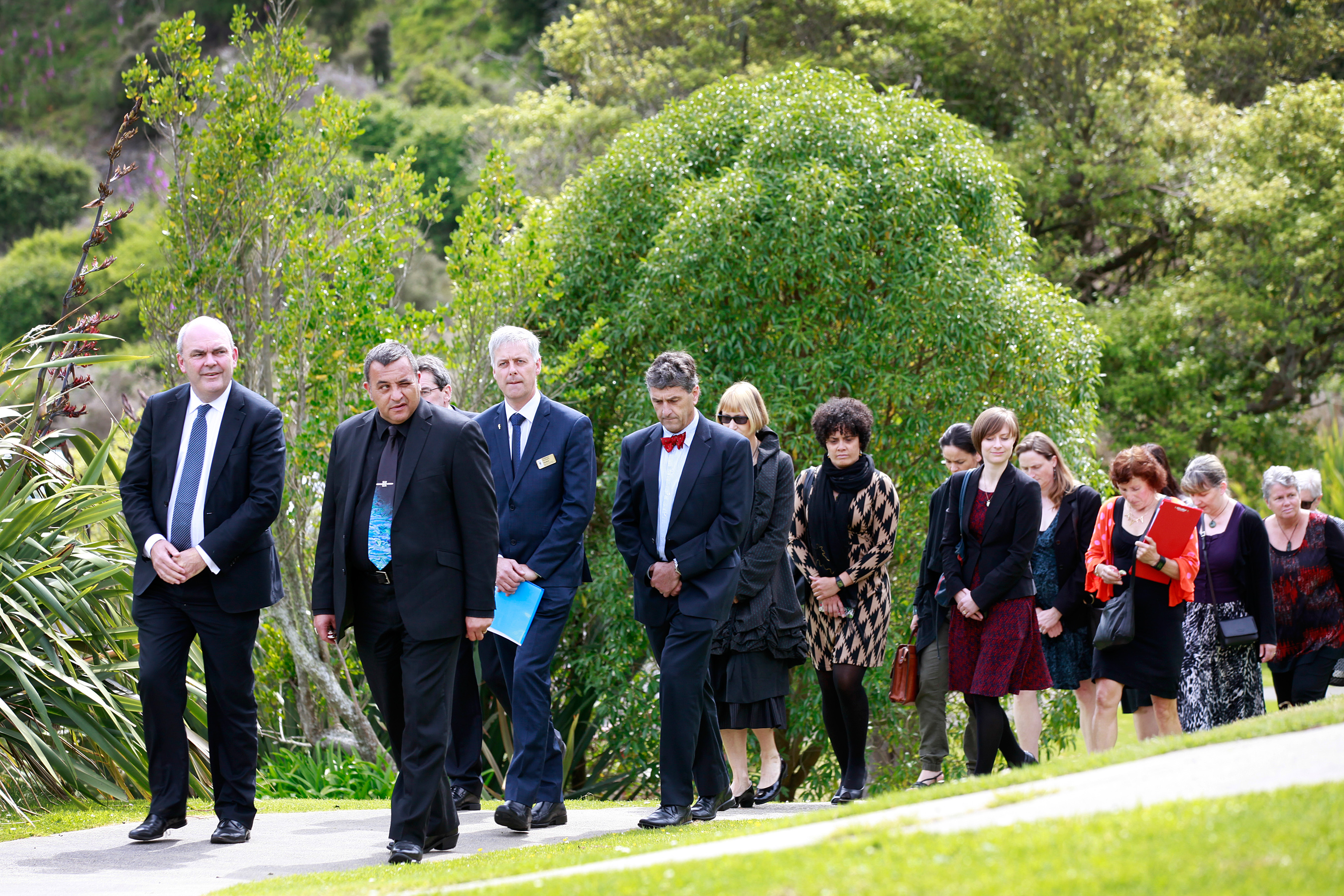
Walking onto Ōtākou marae at the launch of Healthier Lives on 4 December 2015, Steven Joyce on the far left

The New Zealand Government agreed in August 2012 to fund National Science Challenges: large multi-year collaborative research programmes that would address important issues in New Zealand's future. The funding criteria were set out in January 2014, with proposals assessed by a Science Board within the Ministry of Business, Innovation, and Employment (MBIE).

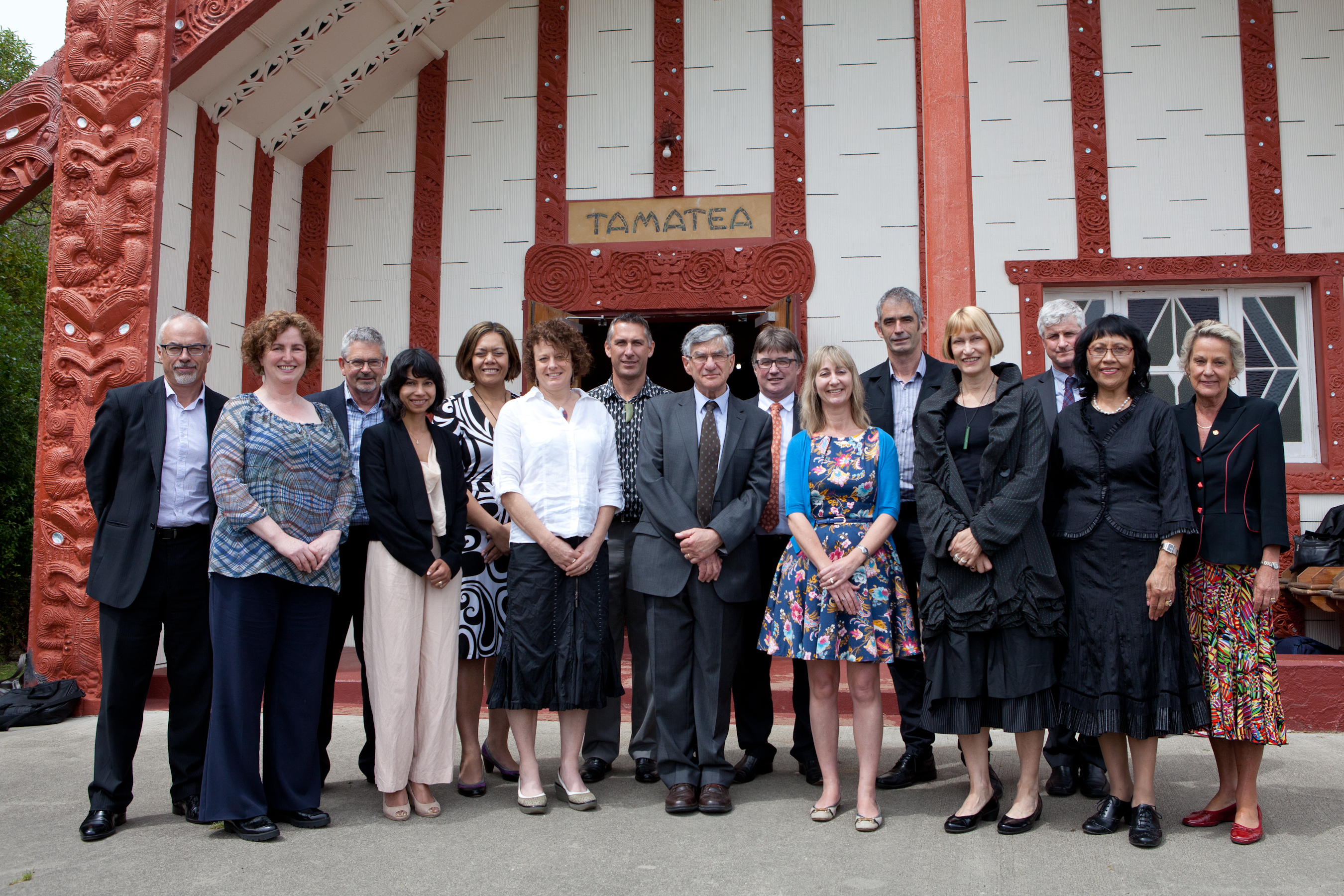
The Healthier Lives Governance Group and Science Leadership Team at its launch in December 2015

In April 2015 Jenny McMahon was appointed the first Chair of the 7-member Governance Group for Healthier Lives, which held its first full meeting on 27 October 2015. In August 2015 MBIE approved funding for the Heathier Lives National Science Challenge (HLNSC), with a budget of $31.26 million over 10 years. Additional funding came from collaborations: the Long Term Conditions partnership with the Health Research Council and the Ministry of Health established five research projects with a total budget of $7.9 million, and a partnership equally funded by HLNSC and the Heart Foundation supported a $2 million three-year study, Manawataki Fatu Fatu, on cardiovascular disease inequities amongst Māori and Pasifika.

University of Otago professor Jim Mann was appointed as director of Healthier Lives, and the programme was launched at a ceremony at Ōtākou Marae on Otago Peninsula on 4 December 2015. The University of Otago was chosen to host HLNSC, with other research partners around New Zealand including AgResearch, Auckland University of Technology, ESR, the Malaghan Institute of Medical Research, Massey University, the University of Auckland, the University of Canterbury, the University of Waikato and Victoria University of Wellington.

A four-member Kāhui Māori group was established in 2016, and on 19 October it proposed a co-governance arrangement with the Governance Group, to be trialled for a year; HLNSC thus became the first National Science Challenge to adopt co-governance. A review in May 2018 endorsed the co-governance arrangement and in February 2019 it was formalised in the Collaboration Agreement with other institutions. A single 8-member entity, the Governance Group and Kāhui Māori, was established. In 2020, at the end of the first five-year funding period, Jenny McMahon stepped down, and Sir Jerry Mateparae was appointed chair.

== Research ==
The focus of Heathier Lives was four chronic, non-communicable diseases: cancer, cardiovascular disease, obesity, and type 2 diabetes, which together account for one third of total death and disability in New Zealand. At the time of establishment, the stated goal of Healthier Lives was to reduce the overall burden of these diseases on New Zealand's health system by 25% by the year 2025. At the halfway point HLNSC underwent a public consultation process and a research review by six international scientists to develop its 2019–2014 research strategy. This strategy addressed three areas: precision medicine for cancer and cardiovascular disease; culturally-centred health programmes for Māori and Pasifika; and healthy food and physical activity environments. The use of big and linked data to answer health questions was also a focus of research. At the end of the review, MBIE commented that HLNSC had "developed exemplary methods of community engagement, and has co-created 40% of its research with stakeholders, which means implementation of research is more likely."

New Zealand has significant health inequities, with Māori having 1.8 times higher rates of cardiovascular disease mortality than non-Māori, and Pasifika 9.1 times the mortality rates of Pākehā from type 2 diabetes. Māori life expectancy is seven years shorter than Pākehā, and Pasifika six years; the life expectancy gap is not closing for Pasifika and increasing rates of diabetes means it is likely to widen. After consultation and hui with Māori and Pacific community leaders and researchers, Heathier Lives funded research to reduce health inequities: co-designed and community-led healthcare programmes; an Implementation Network to assist the uptake of these research programmes; and initiatives to create systemic change in the New Zealand health system to support equitable outcomes from new programmes.

=== Precision medicine ===
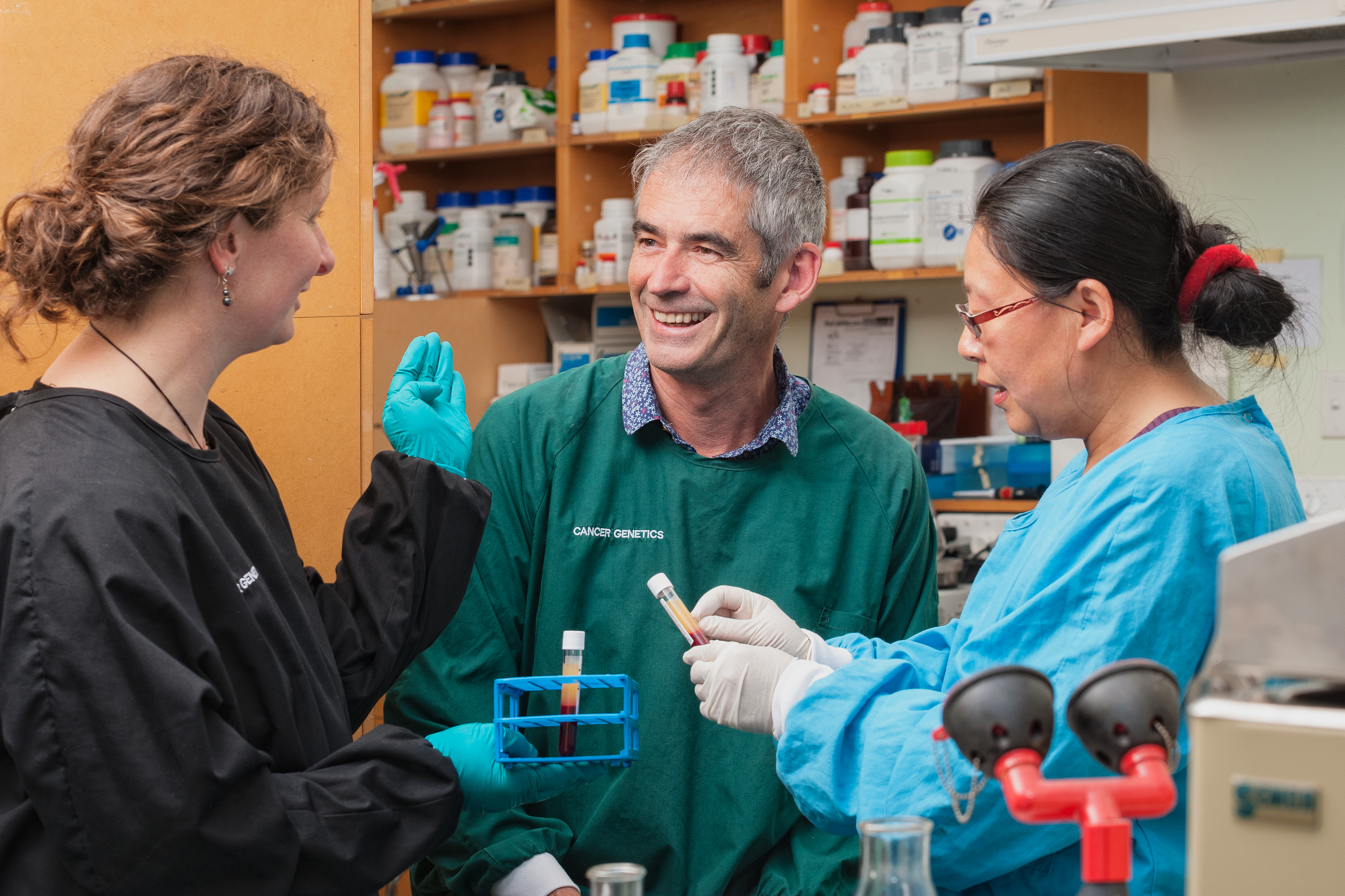
Tanis Godwin, Parry Guilford, and Donghui Zou in Guilford's lab

Healthier Lives supported the development of precision medicine techniques, for example using tumour-derived DNA circulating in the blood (ctDNA). Parry Guilford and Cris Print developed sensitive ctDNA assays for colorectal cancer and melanoma, both prevalent in New Zealand, and the technology is being applied to breast, stomach, lung, prostate and neuroendocrine cancers to detect early relapse and allow timely treatment. Because this type of testing only requires a blood sample instead of a hospital with MRI facilities, it has potential for use in isolated or rural communities. The research team summarised their work on ctDNA for treatment monitoring and early detection in a three-episode podcast called Sticking it to Cancer.

A study led by Rod Jackson created new and more accurate equations for predicting the risk of cardiovascular disease. The clinical study of 400,000 New Zealanders aged 30–74 revealed differences in risk from socioeconomic factors and ethnicity: Māori, Pacific, and Indian patients had a 13–48% greater risk of cardiovascular disease than Pākehā, but Chinese and other Asian New Zealanders had a 25–33% lower risk. The research replaced risk prediction equations developed from a much earlier US study of just 5,000 people which significantly overestimated risk for the healthy majority, while underestimating risk factors in others, potentially leading to under-treatment of vulnerable, high-risk groups. The Ministry of Health adopted the new equations into its 2018 guidelines and issued a new data standard, which was incorporated into MedTech, the medical records system widely used by New Zealand GPs.

External videos
- Developing precise and equitable cardiovascular disease risk prediction tools in Aotearoa (Feb 2024)

Another approach to predicting risk of cardiovascular disease was developed by a team led by Greg T. Jones using epigenetics: reversible changes to DNA from environmental factors such as smoking. One type of epigenetic change, DNA methylation, can be altered by cardiovascular disease. Jones's team developed a risk model based on DNA methylation profiles of people with heart disease, combined with genetic markers and known risk factors.

=== Culturally-centred Māori and Pasifika health programmes ===
Research led by Nina Scott, John Oetzel, and Bridgette Masters-Awatere in partnership with Māori health providers Te Kōhao Health and Poutiri Charitable Trust developed a set of guidelines for health interventions with Māori communities – the He Pikinga Waiora Implementation Framework –based on building relationships and co-designing the way health interventions are carried out. The Framework was used to co-design two health programmes, one targeting Māori men at risk of diabetes, cardiovascular disease and obesity, and the other, Kimi Ora, a healthy lifestyle intervention.

External videos
- Community-led research for sustainable futures (Feb 2024)

Te Kāika DiRECT, a randomised controlled trial of 40 participants, most Māori or Pasifika, with prediabetes or type 2 diabetes, examined the effectiveness of a total three-month meal replacement regime and behavioural support for weight loss; the results suggested it was a non-surgical alternative to a solely dietitian-supported care programme. The prevalence of type 2 diabetes in Pasifika is twice that of Pākehā, and two studies led by Pacific researcher Ridvan Firestone addressed this. The Pasifika Prediabetes Youth Empowerment Programme (PPYEP) involved community providers The Fono and South Waikato Pacific Islands Community Services (SWPICS) working with Pasifika youth and adults to reduce risk factors for prediabetes. SWPICS was also part of a community-led study Oire Tokoroa, which successfully worked with 20 families in the Pacific community in Tokoroa to help those with prediabetes or type 2 diabetes make healthier lifestyle choices, including developing a cookbook.

The Mana Tū project, initiated by the National Hauora Coalition, which set up a network of community health workers and GPs to support Māori and Pacific people living with type 2 diabetes, was evaluated by Matire Harwood. The three-year trial studied the effectiveness of training healthcare navigators/kaimanaaki (social workers, nurses, and receptionists) to work with diabetes patients, with 400 participants over 10 GP clinics. Another project, Manawataki Fatu Fatu, led by Corina Grey and Matire Harwood and co-funded by the Heart Foundation, studied gaps in the assessment, care, and management of cardiovascular disease in Māori and Pacific communities. They found that improved hospital discharge summaries (especially for heart failure) and recruitment, retention, and support for the Māori and Pasifika CVD workforce were needed to reduce inequities in heart healthcare.

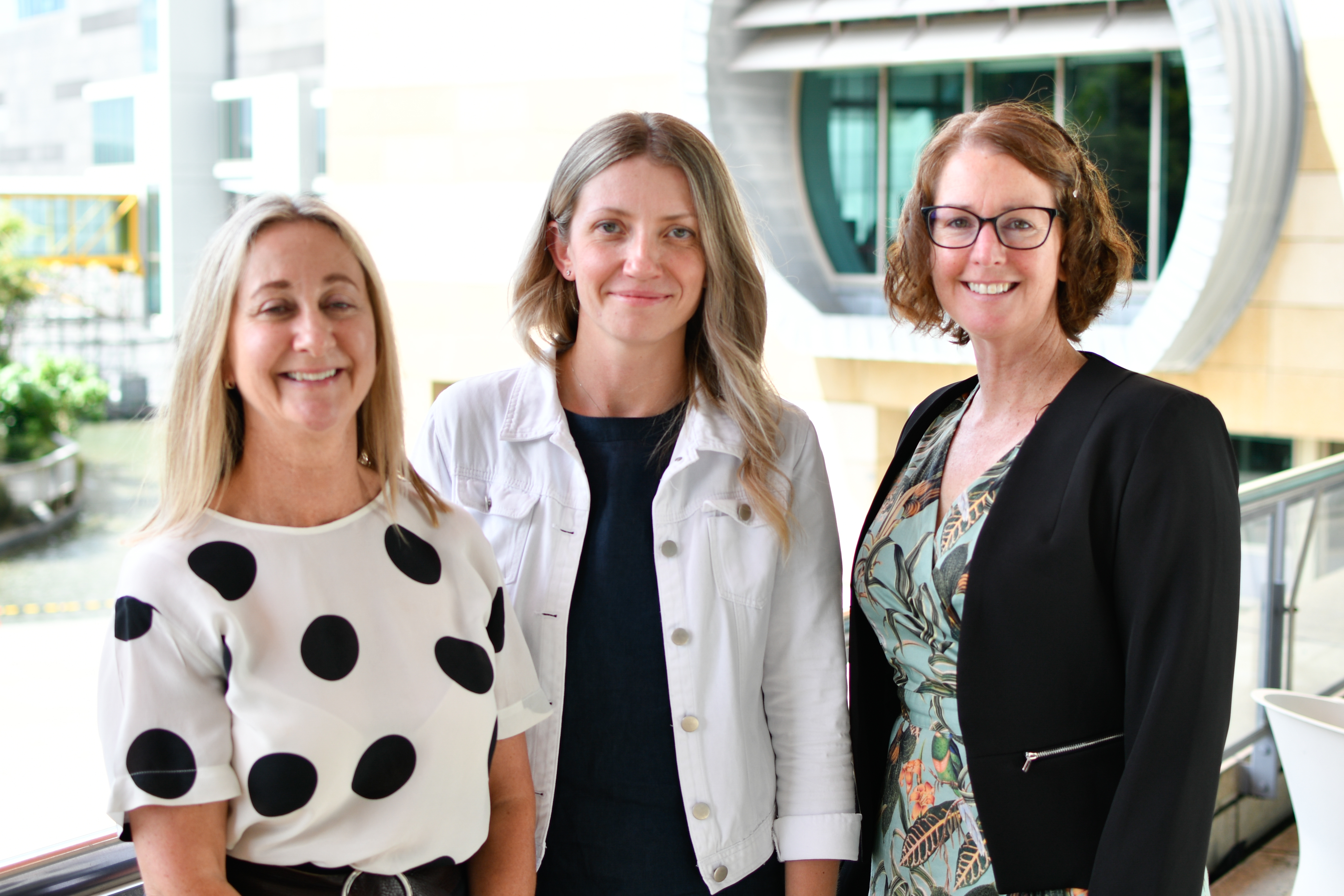
Clíona Ní Mhurchú, Magda Rosin, and Cristina Cleghorn at the Healthier Lives Kōrero Tahi symposium, Feb 2024

OL@-OR@, a mobile-phone app delivering lifestyle support programme for Māori and Pasifika, was co-designed and evaluated in a partnership between a team of university researchers led by Clíona Ní Mhurchú, Lisa Te Morenga, and Ridvan Firestone, and community providers Toi Tangata, The Fono, and South Waikato Pacific Islands Community Services.

A network of primary health providers and researchers, the Healthier Lives Implementation Network, was set up to translate research into practice and better meet the health needs of Māori and Pacific communities. The Health Systems Change project, led by Sue Crengle, addressed ethnic health inequities by developing an equity-focussed implementation framework (FrEEIA) and equity readiness assessment tool for mainstream health interventions – the first adapted for a New Zealand context – which was trialled in a three-year lung cancer screening intervention.

=== Healthy foods and physical activity ===
Research by Andrew Reynolds and colleagues established the evidence for the health benefits of increasing dietary fibre and replacing refined grains with whole grains. Their work also supported the importance of replacing trans fats and saturated fats with polyunsaturated fats, plant monounsaturated fats, and slowly-digested carbohydrates in one's diet to reduce the risk of coronary heart disease. These findings contributed to updated European guidelines for dietary management of diabetes, including the possibility of reversing type 2 diabetes through weight loss, and World Health Organization guidelines on dietary carbohydrate and fat.

External image
- Sustainable dietary intake, an illustration by Yasmine El Orfi

Research led by Cristina Cleghorn found that a New Zealand version of a sustainable healthy diet (based on the EAT-Lancet Commission planetary health diet), when modelled, was no more expensive than current diets, halved associated greenhouse gas emissions, and provided large health gains, cost savings and reductions in ethnic health inequities. Collaborative research with the Our Land and Water National Science Challenge modelled the changes in New Zealand land use that would produce food for this optimised healthy diet, and found that it would be possible to feed all New Zealanders while reducing greenhouse gas emissions and freshwater contamination, as well as minimising the financial impact on families and farmers. Related research led by Andrew Reynolds modelled five scenarios for replacing red meat in the New Zealand diet and found significant benefits associated with all of them.

External videos
- Healthy food environments (A Feb 2024 discussion with Clíona Ní Mhurchú and others)
- Healthy physical activity environments (Feb 2024 presentation by Karen Witten, Simon Kingham, and others)
- ACTIVATION Project Christchurch (Short film by Ollie Dawes on shared e-bikes and cars in Christchurch)
- ACTIVATION Māngere E-bike Trial (Short film by Ollie Dawes)

The HYPE (Healthy Policy Evaluation) project, led by Clíona Ní Mhurchú, examined the voluntary National Healthy Food and Drink Policy developed for public sector organisations such as District Health Boards. The HYPE team examined nine organisations that had adopted the policy but found none met its criteria, though the food and drink they had available for sale was healthier than organisations which had not adopted the policy. They concluded the voluntary policy was ineffective, recommended a mandatory one be adopted, and developed new resources to support implementation of this policy in the public sector.

Karen Witten and colleagues undertook the ACTIVATION research programme, which looked at encouraging active transport — walking and cycling – and improving community infrastructure to reduce car dependence. Researchers examined barriers to active mobility in South Auckland, and how these could be overcome. In Christchurch, they studied the growth of inner-city housing following the Canterbury earthquakes of 2010–2011, and how housing and transport design could encourage active transport. A study of the effect of the 2022–2023 half-price bus fares in Christchurch found 45% of lower-income residents had been able to afford additional trips and more food and essentials.

=== Big and linked data ===
Statistics New Zealand makes large amounts of anonymised data available for analysis through its Integrated Data Infrastructure (IDI). However two problems make this data less useful for health research: a lack of primary care data, and linkage bias. Linkage errors happen when probabilistic linking of data through name, date of birth, or sex incorrectly match records; when these errors are correlated with ethnicity, linkage bias can occur. A HLNSC project led by Andrea Teng developed a guide for health researchers on linkage bias in the IDI. The team also examined how to link community lab information to the wider health system, using a dataset of ten years of test results for Heliobacter pylori, a major cause of stomach cancer which has significantly different death rates across ethnicities in New Zealand.

Several studies led by Andrea Teng used big data to answer health questions: one looked at the rates of cardiovascular disease following the Canterbury earthquakes, another at the factors affecting the progression of prediabetes to type 2 diabetes in New Zealand (including the novel finding that speaking Te Reo Māori is associated with a reduced risk of progression), and a third estimated the prevalence of cancer in New Zealand.

== Key reports ==
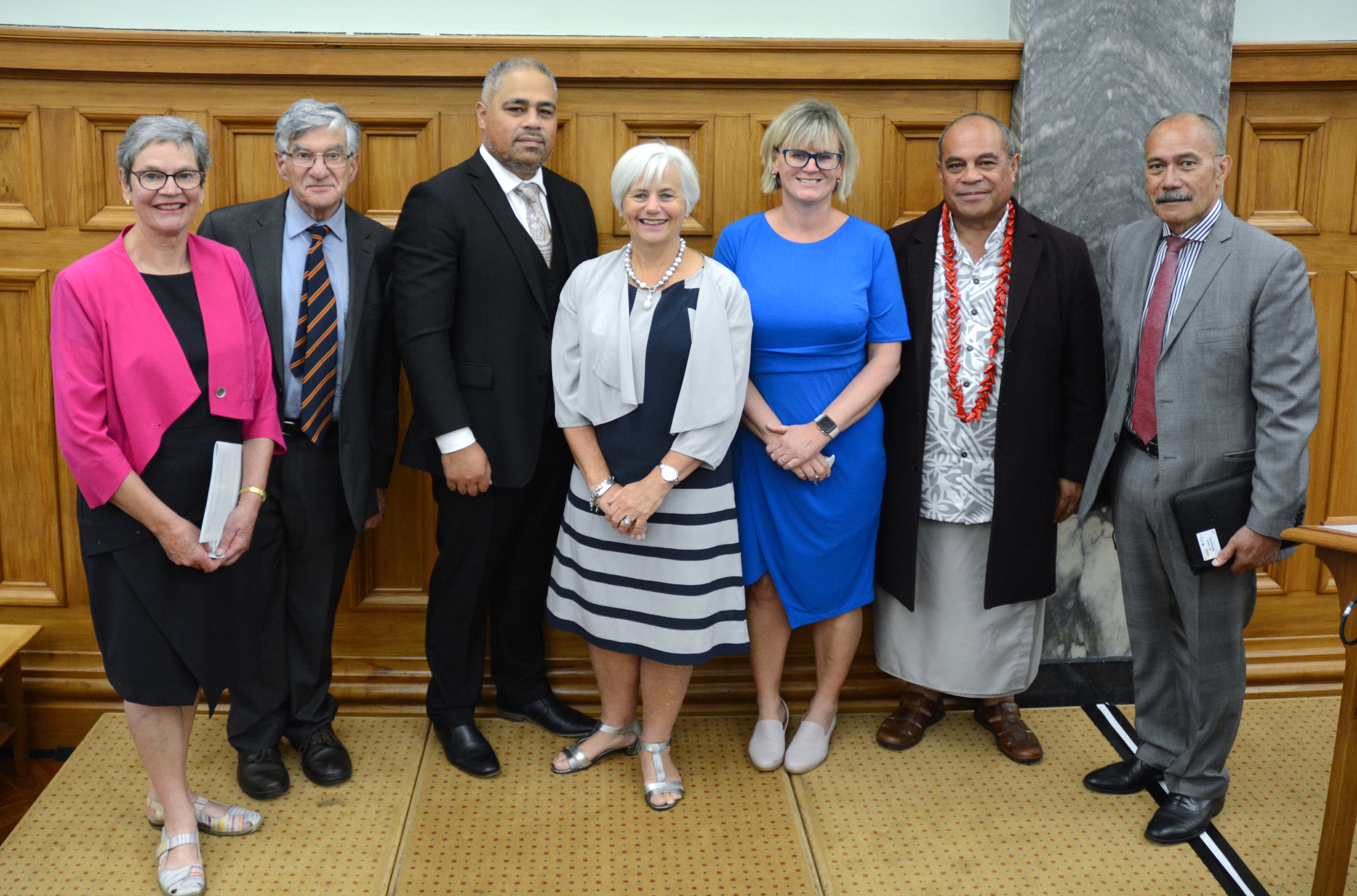
Presentation of The Economic and Social Cost of Type 2 Diabetes report to the New Zealand Parliament in 2021

The Focus on Fibre and Food Monitoring symposium co-hosted in Dunedin by Healthier Lives in February 2019 presented the latest research on the role of dietary fibre in preventing and treating non-communicable diseases; it also identified the need for a national nutrition survey to inform New Zealand health research and policy. In October 2021, the Ministry of Health commissioned a team at the National Institute for Health Innovation, led by Healthier Lives deputy director Clíona Ní Mhurchú, to develop the methods and tools for the next survey.

A 2021 report, The Economic and Social Cost of Type 2 Diabetes, commissioned by Healthier Lives, the Edgar Diabetes and Obesity Research Centre, Diabetes New Zealand and philanthropists Tony and Heather Falkenstein, estimated that the number of New Zealanders with type 2 diabetes would increase by 70–90% by 2040 and examined the projected economic and social costs. Healthier Lives called on the Government to develop a national strategy for tackling type 2 diabetes. In 2023, Te Whatu Ora and Te Aka Whai Ora established a working group, co-chaired by Healthier Lives director Jim Mann, to develop a National Diabetes Action Plan.

A 2022 report, Pathways between research, policy and practice, highlighted the frustration of health researchers with the slow uptake of research evidence to improve the health of New Zealanders. The report, which arose from a public webinar held on 17 November 2021, suggested ways of strengthening the pathway between research and its application.

A kaupapa Māori evaluation of several Healthier Lives co-designed projects led to the 2024 report Co-designing Health Research in Aotearoa New Zealand and an accompanying short guide. The report offered an evidence-based approach for co-designing research with Māori and Pacific communities, and a benchmark for assessing the integrity of future co-designed research projects.

When the National Science Challenges came to an end in 2024, the Healthier Lives management group published Healthier Lives for All New Zealanders: Evidence for equitable health outcomes in Aotearoa New Zealand, a final report summarising the project's history, goals, key research areas, and achievements of its teams and community partners.

== Publications ==
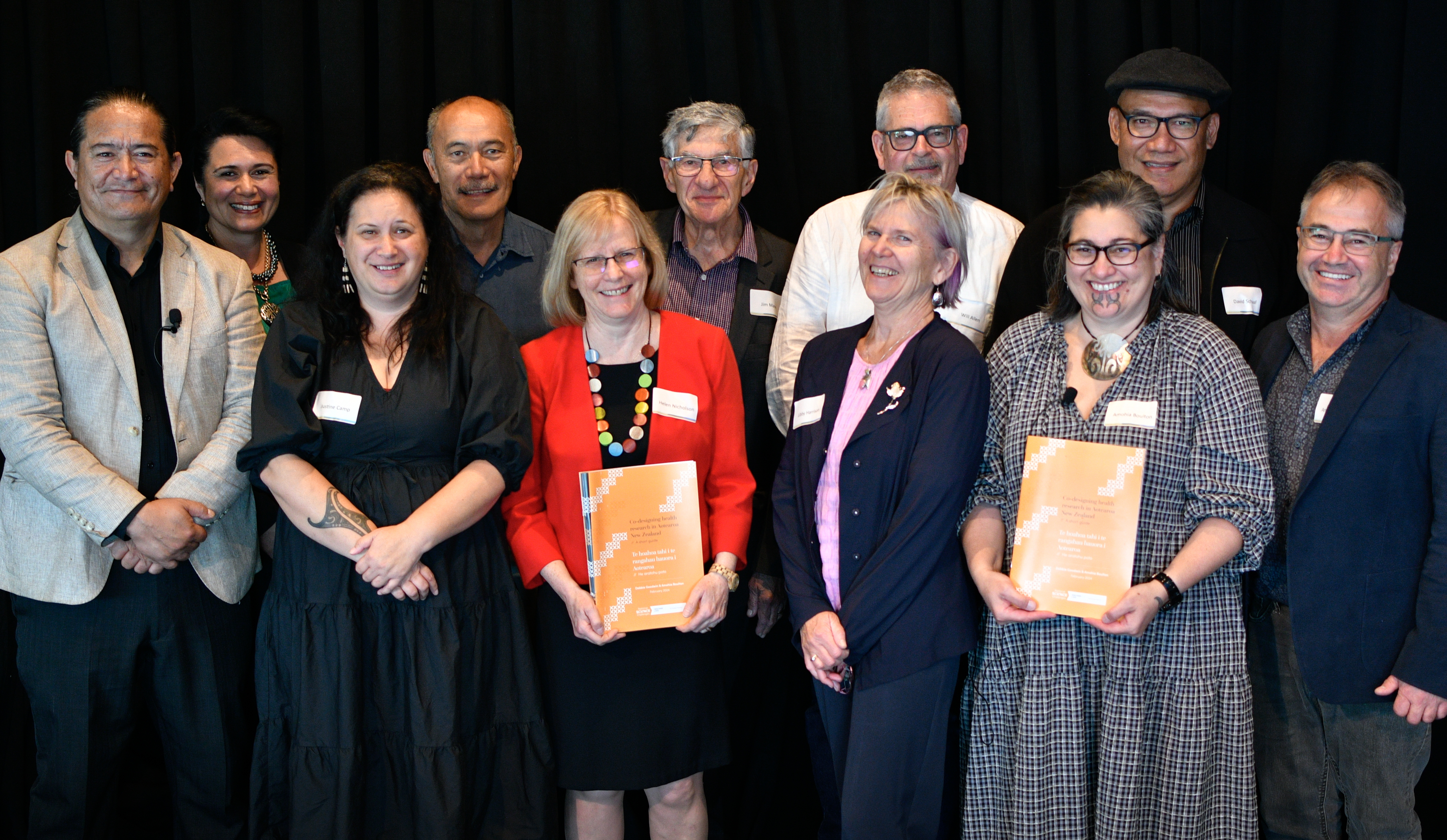
Healthier Lives Governance Group and Kāhui Māori at the launch of Co-designing health research, Te Papa, February 2024

- Healthier Lives – He Oranga Hauora. (June 2019). Heathier Lives National Science Challenge Research Strategy 2019–2024. Dunedin: Department of Medicine, University of Otago.
- Leakey, C.J., Curtin, J., and Greaves, L.M. (24 March 2022). Healthier Lives National Science Challenge: Policy Inventory. Auckland: Public Policy Institute, University of Auckland. doi:10.17608/k6.auckland.19372769. A list of the 15 New Zealand Government policies relevant to the Healthier Lives research programme.
- Mann, J., Cockram, J., Glen, J., and Stayner, C. (November 2022). Pathways between research policy and practice for equitable evidence-informed health and wellbeing in Aotearoa's new health system. Healthier Lives–He Oranga Hauora National Science Challenge. ISBN 978-0-473-64187-0.
- Evidence for Health and Wellbeing in Aotearoa New Zealand (PDF), Dunedin: University of Otago, September 2023, Wikidata Q124618162. This report, initiated by Healthier Lives, summarised research from three Science Challenges for health system leaders.
- Goodwin, Debbie & Boulton, Amohia. (February 2024). Co-designing health research in Aotearoa New Zealand: Lessons from the Healthier Lives National Science Challenge. Healthier Lives–He Oranga Hauora National Science Challenge ISBN 978-0-473-63852-8.
- Mann, Jim; Ni Mhurchu, Cliona; Sporle, Andrew; Guilford, Parry; Cockram, Jean; Stayner, Cherie (June 2024). Healthier Lives for All New Zealanders: Evidence for equitable health outcomes in Aotearoa New Zealand [He Oranga Hauora Ake mō ngā Tāngata Katoa o Aotearoa: He taunakitanga mō ngā putanga hauora tōkeke i Aotearoa]. Dunedin: Healthier Lives–He Oranga Hauora National Science Challenge. ISBN 978-0-473-71837-4.
