= Janet Wilmshurst =

New Zealand palaeoecologist

Janet Wilmshurst FRSNZ
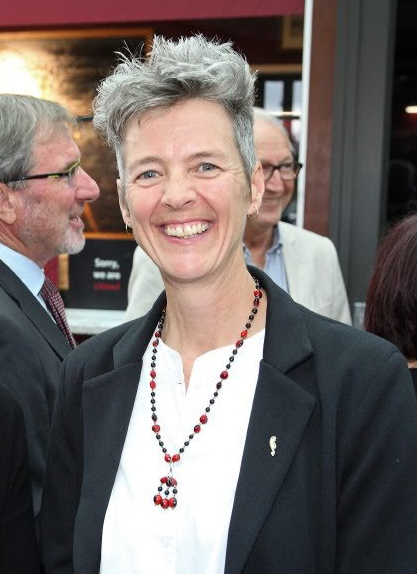
- Wilmshurst in 2019 at the 25th birthday celebrations of the Marsden Fund
- Born: 1966 (age 59–60); Andover, Hampshire, England
- Education: University of Canterbury
- Scientific career
- Fields: Paleoecology
- Workplaces: Manaaki Whenua – Landcare Research
- Thesis: A 2000 year history of vegetation and landscape change in Hawke's Bay, North Island, New Zealand (1995)
- Doctoral advisors: Vida Stout; Matt McGlone

Janet Mary Wilmshurst FRSNZ (born 1966) is a New Zealand palaeoecologist who works on reconstructing the ecological past. Wilmshurst has been a Fellow of the Royal Society Te Apārangi since 2015. She was president of the New Zealand Ecological Society, and currently works as principal scientist in long-term ecology at Manaaki Whenua Landcare Research focusing on recent fossil records to reconstruct and trace past ecosystem changes in response to natural disturbance.

== Education ==
Born in Andover, Hampshire, England, in 1966, Wilmshurst earned a BSc in environmental science at the University of Plymouth in 1988. She then completed a PhD at the University of Canterbury in 1995, with a thesis titled A 2000 year history of vegetation and landscape change in Hawke's Bay, North Island, New Zealand, supervised by Vida Stout and Matt McGlone.

== Research ==
Wilmshurst's research focuses on the use of different fossil types to explore ecological history. Her research has employed a variety of samples including fossilised dung, seeds, pollen, and charcoal. She has worked on fire disturbance, human settlement and other impacts on past ecosystems. Wilmshurst obtained a Marsden grant to work with Atholl Anderson, Thomas Higham and Trevor Worthy to explore Polynesian settlement throughout New Zealand and the Pacific using carbon dating of rat-gnawed seeds. This work established that rats were widespread in New Zealand from circa 1280, but were not found before this date, and was at odds with earlier dates for rat arrival of up to 1000 years earlier, inferred from dating of rat bones.

Wilmshurst used fossilised gizzards and moa coprolites to explore the diet of the extinct little bush moa in Fiordland National Park, in a study in which fossilised "poo paints a picture of the past". Wilmshurst and her team showed that little bush moa dispersed few seeds via dung, unlike other moa species.

Wilmshurst was president of the New Zealand Ecological Society in 2001/2002, and currently works as principal scientist in long-term ecology at Manaaki Whenua Landcare Research.

== Honours and awards ==
In 2013, Wilmshurst won the "Te Tohu Taiao Award for Ecological Excellence", conferred by the New Zealand Ecological Society. Wilmshurst won the New Zealand Ecological Society's "Outstanding Publication on New Zealand Ecology" award in 2016 for her paper Use of pollen and ancient DNA as conservation baselines for offshore islands in New Zealand, published in Conservation Biology.

Wilmshurst was elected a Fellow of the Royal Society Te Apārangi in 2015.

In 2026 Wilmshurst was awarded the Hutton Medal in recognition for her contributions in improving the knowledge concerning New Zealand's ecological past.

== Selected publications ==
- Wilmshurst, Janet Mary; Anderson, Atholl John; Higham, Thomas; Worthy, Trevor Henry (2008). "Dating the late prehistoric dispersal of Polynesians to New Zealand using the commensal Pacific rat". Proceedings of the National Academy of Sciences of the United States of America. 105 (22): 7676–80. Bibcode:2008PNAS..105.7676W. doi:10.1073/pnas.0801507105. PMC 2409139. PMID 18523023. Wikidata Q28754348.
- Power, Mitchell J.; Marlon, Jennifer R.; Ortiz, N; et al. (2007). "Changes in fire regimes since the Last Glacial Maximum: an assessment based on a global synthesis and analysis of charcoal data". Climate Dynamics. 30 (7–8): 887–907. Bibcode:2008ClDy...30..887P. doi:10.1007/s00382-007-0334-x. Wikidata Q57264410.
- Wilmshurst, Janet Mary; Hunt, Terry; Lipo, Carl Philipp; Anderson, Atholl John (2010). "High-precision radiocarbon dating shows recent and rapid initial human colonization of East Polynesia". Proceedings of the National Academy of Sciences of the United States of America. 108 (5): 1815–1820. Bibcode:2011PNAS..108.1815W. doi:10.1073/pnas.1015876108. PMC 3033267. PMID 21187404. Wikidata Q29028441.
