= Roger Cooper =

Roger Cooper may refer to:

- Roger Cooper (politician) (born 1944), Minnesota politician
- Roger Cooper (businessman) (1935–2025), British businessman imprisoned in Iran on espionage charges
- Roger Cooper (paleontologist) (1939–2020), New Zealand paleontologist
