= Hutton Medal =

Annual award given to a New Zealand scientific or technological researcher

The Hutton Medal is awarded annually by the Royal Society Te Apārangi to a researcher who, working within New Zealand, has significantly advanced understanding through work of outstanding scientific or technological merit.

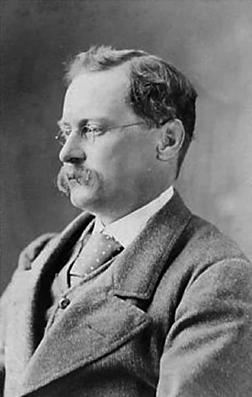
Frederick Wollaston Hutton

== Requirements ==
Prior to 2017 it was awarded in rotation for research in animal sciences, earth sciences, or plant sciences. From, and including, 2017, it is awarded to any of the three disciplines but will not normally be awarded in the same discipline two years in a row. The awardee must have received the greater part of his/her education in New Zealand or have resided in New Zealand for not less than 10 years.

The bronze medal has a portrait of Hutton on one side, with a landscape on the reverse featuring a kiwi, a tuatara, New Zealand plants (Celmisia, Phormium, Cordyline) and an active volcano in the background.

== Background ==
The award is named after Frederick Wollaston Hutton FRS (1836–1905). Hutton was the first President of the New Zealand Institute (the forerunner to the Royal Society), serving from 1904 to 1905. In 1909 the Hutton Memorial Fund was established to support the Hutton Medal and also grants for research in New Zealand zoology, botany or geology.

Until 1996 the medal was awarded not more than once every three years, from 1996 to 2008 the medal was awarded biennially and from 2009 it has been awarded annually.

== Recipients ==
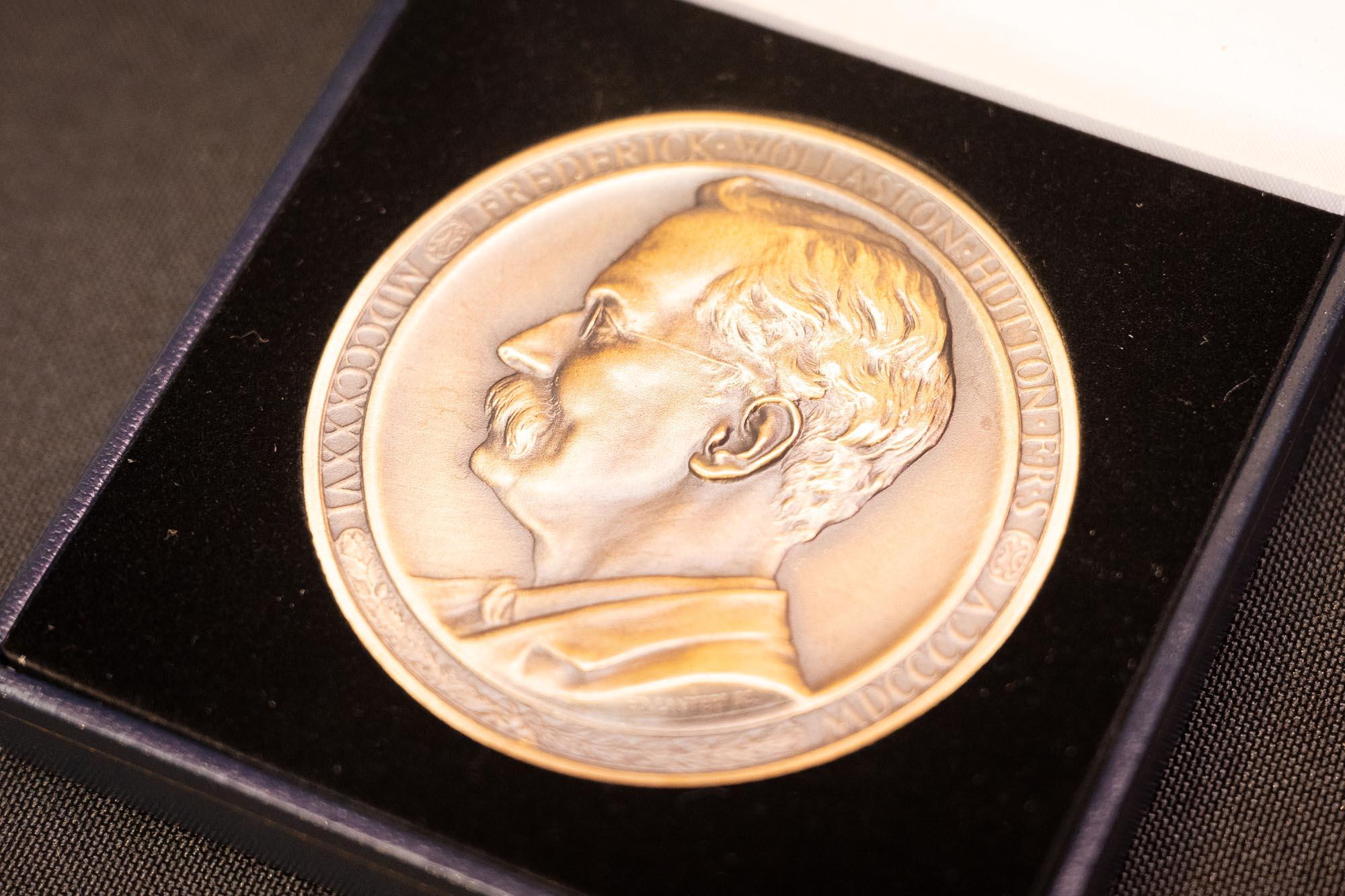
Hutton Medal in 2024

There have been the following recipients of the Hutton Medal.

Year	Recipient(s)	Citation
1911	William Benham	
1914	Leonard Cockayne	
1917	Patrick Marshall	
1920	John Holloway	
1923	Allan Thomson	
1926	Charles Chilton	
1929	George Hudson	
1932	Arthur Bartrum	
1935	Gordon Herriot Cunningham	
1938	David Miller	
1941	Harry Allan	
1944	Noel Benson	
1947	Charles Cotton	
1950	Walter Oliver	
1953	John Marwick	
1956	Charles Fleming	
1959	Laurence Richardson	
1962	Barry Fell	
1965	Lucy Moore	
1968	Norcott Hornibrook	
1971	Ray Forster	
1974	Maxwell Gage	
1977	William Philipson	
1980	George Knox	
1983	Pat Suggate	
1986	Eric Godley	
1989	Rufus Wells	
1992	George Scott	
1995	Geoff Baylis	
1996	Richard Norris	"For his major impact on the understanding of geological processes at the continental (New Zealand) plate boundary"
1997	Alan Mark	
1998	Alan Kirton	"For his outstanding contribution to meat science and technology"
1999	Hugh Bibby	"For fundamental contributions to earth sciences in earth deformation analysis and geo-electrical prospecting"
2000	Henry Connor and Elizabeth Edgar	"For their extremely meritorious contributions to the botanical classification and documentation of New Zealand’s flora"
2002	Roger Morris	"For his outstanding contribution to the advancement of animal science as a veterinarian and epidemiologist"
2004	Campbell Nelson	"For major contributions in the fields of sedimentology and paleoclimate research"
2006	Colin Webb	"For major contributions to plant systematics and evolutionary biology"
2008	Bryce Buddle	"For his world-leading research into controlling infectious animal diseases"
2009	Colin Wilson	"For his outstanding work on volcanism"
2010	David Galloway	"For his significant contributions to understanding the New Zealand environment, particularly through his botanical work on New Zealand lichens"
2011	Robert Poulin	"For his leading research in the field of parasitic diseases, especially for his work in ecological parasitology, an area of particular relevance to New Zealand’s marine and freshwater ecosystems"
2012	Ewan Fordyce	"For his seminal contributions in New Zealand vertebrate paleontology, particularly for whales, dolphins and penguins"
2013	Dave Kelly	"For developing knowledge of native flora in New Zealand and defining the key interactions between plants and animals. He has made long-term studies of South Island ecosystems, including decade-long studies to understand ‘mast seeding’ where plant species synchronise production of an unusually large seed crop"
2014	Not awarded	
2015	Lionel Carter	"For his career-long contributions to marine geology in New Zealand through fundamental investigations of sea-floor geological processes and their application to assessment of hazards and resources"
2016	Wendy Nelson	"For her significant contributions to understanding the diversity, biology and evolution of marine macroalgae"
2017	Roger Cooper	"For his contributions to understanding the geological foundations and the earliest organisms of Zealandia and beyond and for his role in maintaining and developing paleobiology expertise in New Zealand, which uses rocks to study ancient biology"
2018	Bruce Hayward	"For outstanding contributions to the knowledge of New Zealand's marine ecology and geology"
2019	Philip Hulme	"For his outstanding contributions to the knowledge of plant invasions in New Zealand, especially his innovative insights in why and how non-native plants become invasive weeds"
2020	Neil Gemmell	"For his research that is fundamentally changing our understanding of animal ecology and evolution and is driving the development of new approaches for conservation and management of the world’s rarest species"
2021	Richard McDowell	"For his work on nutrient flows in soils and water, and informing farm management and environmental policy"
2022	Rupert Sutherland	"For fundamental discoveries in global plate tectonics, the evolution of Zealandia and the implications for active faulting and large magnitude earthquakes in New Zealand"
2023	Nicholas Golledge	"for his cutting-edge contributions to modelling of the Antarctic ice sheet, and research on climate change, including his role as a Lead Author for the most recent Assessment Report from the Intergovernmental Panel on Climate Change (IPCC)"
2024	Andrew Allan	"For world-leading research on plant genomics, in support of New Zealand's plant breeding programmes."
2025	Dennis Gordon	"For extraordinary contributions to global taxonomy, as the world’s leading authority on bryozoa, and publication of the New Zealand Inventory of Biodiversity."
2026	Janet Wilmshurst	"For transforming our understanding of how climate, human settlement, fire, and volcanic eruptions have shaped ecosystems across Aotearoa New Zealand"
