= The Deep South, Te Kōmata o Te Tonga =

New Zealand scientific research programme

- Established: 5 August 2014
- Type: Research programme
- Location: New Zealand
- Director: Phil Wiles
- Budget: $51.1m NZD
- Funding: MBIE
- Website: deepsouthchallenge.co.nz

The Deep South, Te Kōmata o Te Tonga was one of New Zealand's eleven collaborative research programmes known as National Science Challenges. Running from 2014 to 2024, the focus of The Deep South Challenge research was adapting to and managing the risk of climate change. Specifically, the programme addressed the role of the Antarctic and Southern Ocean in determining New Zealand's future climate and its impact on key economic sectors, infrastructure and natural resources.

== Establishment and governance ==
The New Zealand Government agreed in August 2012 to fund National Science Challenges: large multi-year collaborative research programmes that would address important issues in New Zealand's future. The funding criteria were set out in January 2014, with proposals assessed by a Science Board within the Ministry of Business, Innovation, and Employment (MBIE). In August 2014, Science and Innovation Minister Steven Joyce launched the Deep South Challenge at NIWA’s Wellington campus. Roger France was appointed the Chair the Governance Board, Rob Murdoch was appointed the interim Director, and Richard Nottage was appointed to the role of Challenge Manager. By 2024, Chris Kelly was the chair, Phil Wiles the Director, and Mark Webley the Challenge Manager.

== Research ==
The Deep South Science Challenge aimed to enhance understanding of New Zealand's changing climate to support decision-making for adaptation. During its first phase, engagement confirmed the need to focus on five key climate impacts: climate extremes, floods, droughts, changes in temperature and rainfall, and sea-level rise.

To improve projections of New Zealand's changing climate, the program integrates several models:

- the New Zealand Earth System Model (a global climate model)
- the New Zealand Regional Climate Model,
- the New Zealand Water Model (a national hydrological model), and
- a risk and impacts model

These projections informed research on how the key climate impacts would affect four main domains, helping New Zealand adapt to climate change. These domains were:

- Māori (whānau, hapū, iwi, and Māori business): this research was led by Māori and integrates mātauranga Māori (traditional knowledge), kaupapa Māori research methodology, and climate modelling to understand climate risks and adaptation strategies.
- Communities: this domain aimed to identify the sectors of society and the economy most vulnerable to climate impacts, such as primary industries, geographic communities, and local governments, and understand the patterns of impact on them.
- Infrastructure: researchers wprled with New Zealand's water, transport, and energy sectors to combine technical knowledge with scientific understanding of climate impacts.
- National Economy: this domain focussed on understanding the macroeconomic risks to New Zealand from climate change, particularly concerning extreme events.

The Challenge emphasised ongoing engagement with end-users and decision-makers to ensure that the research was practical and applied.

== Public outreach ==
In November 2023, researchers, industry leaders, and farmers gathered at the Christchurch Town Hall for the Deep South Challenge's "Adapting Aotearoa" conference. Over 100 attendees discussed the urgent need to shift focus from mitigating climate change to adapting to its immediate impacts on agribusiness and the environment.

The conference highlighted the necessity of implementing feasible adaptation strategies across various sectors, including farming, policy, iwi groups, and local government. Economist Anita Wreford, leader of the Challenge's Impacts and Adaptations programme, emphasized the importance of this collaborative approach. She noted the significance of integrating perspectives from science, industry, and policy to develop effective adaptation strategies.

Phil Wiles, director of the Challenge, pointed out that recent severe weather events, such as Cyclone Gabrielle, underscored the pressing need for adaptation discussions. He highlighted that while previous meetings primarily focused on reducing greenhouse gas emissions, this conference uniquely addressed adaptation strategies.
