= Cristin Print =

New Zealand cancer genomics researcher

- Other name: Cris Print
- Education: University of Auckland
- Scientific career
- Fields: cancer research
- Workplaces: University of Auckland
- Thesis: Investigation of the leucocyte activation antigens CG-1, CD100 and HML-1 (1995)

Cristin Gregor (Cris) Print is a New Zealand academic using genomics and bioinfomatics to research cancer. He is currently a Professor of Molecular Medicine and Pathology at the University of Auckland.

== Life ==
Print was born in Palmerston North. From an early age he was interested in the mechanics of objects, disassembling and reassembling lawnmowers. Thanks to an influential teacher, he turned his attention to biology in high school.

Print is married with three children and is an enthusiastic mountain biker.

== Academic career ==
Print graduated in 1989 from Auckland Medical School with a degree in Medicine and Surgery, and worked as a house surgeon in Dunedin.

While working he was a Junior Research Fellow for the Otago Area Health Board, and began research that led to him pursuing a PhD in molecular immunology at the University of Auckland from 1991–1994. Part of the research involved discovering a gene which he named CG-1, after himself and his collaborator Geoff Christensen. His 1995 thesis was titled Investigation of the leucocyte activation antigens CG-1, CD100 and HML-1.

Print continued his research with a four-year postdoctoral fellowship at Walter and Eliza Hall Institute at the University of Melbourne studying apoptosis, the molecular control of programmed cell death. He then moved to Cambridge, where he was a Fellow of St Edmund's College for six years, and became interested in bioinfomatics and genomics. While at Cambridge, he founded a bioinformatics biotechnology company based in Asia, which in 2007 was listed on the Tokyo Stock Exchange.

Print returned to the University of Auckland in 2005, and leads a cross-disciplinary research team investigating human disease, cancer in particular, using bioinformatics, genomics, and system biology. One project used genomic data from 100 Auckland cancer patients to better target therapies, taking into account several hundred genes specific to cancer.

As of 2023 he is deputy chair (previously Director and acting chair) and a board member of the Crown Research Institute ESR, and a board member of Cancer Research NZ. He is also a principal investigator in the Healthier Lives National Science Challenge. He was joint director of the University of Auckland's Bioinformatics Institute, and co-leads Rakeiora, a New Zealand genomics infrastructure programme working with indigenous health data in partnership with Māori leaders.

Print has been President of the New Zealand Society for Oncology, and Vice President of the Auckland Museum Institute (Auckland branch of the Royal Society Te Apārangi).

== Awards ==
In 2022 Print received a Translational Research Award from the New Zealand Society of Oncology, recognising his "outstanding contributions" to translating scientific findings into clinical practice.

In September 2023 he was one of seven recipients of a World Class New Zealand Award at the Kea World Class Awards.

== Selected works ==
- Henare, Kimiora L; Parker, Kate E; Wihongi, Helen; Blenkiron, Cherie; Jansen, Rawiri; Reid, Papaarangi; Findlay, Michael P; Lawrence, Benjamin; Hudson, Maui; Print, Cristin G (2019). "Mapping a route to Indigenous engagement in cancer genomic research". The Lancet Oncology. 20 (6): e327–e335. doi:10.1016/S1470-2045(19)30307-9.
- Thomas, Alexandra; Routh, Eric D.; Pullikuth, Ashok; Jin, Guangxu; Su, Jing; Chou, Jeff W.; Hoadley, Katherine A.; Print, Cristin; Knowlton, Nick; Black, Michael A.; Demaria, Sandra; Wang, Ena; Bedognetti, Davide; Jones, Wendell D.; Mehta, Gaurav A. (3 October 2018). "Tumor mutational burden is a determinant of immune-mediated survival in breast cancer". OncoImmunology. 7 (10) e1490854. doi:10.1080/2162402X.2018.1490854. ISSN 2162-402X. PMC 6207420.
- Harris, Gavin; O'Toole, Sandra; George, Peter; Browett, Peter; Print, Cristin (2017). "Massive parallel sequencing of solid tumours – challenges and opportunities for pathologists". Histopathology. 70 (1): 123–133. doi:10.1111/his.13067. hdl:2292/44507. ISSN 0309-0167.
- Print, Cristin (2016). "The role of emerging bioinformatic methods in improving diagnosis: A primer for beginners". Pathology. 48: S31. doi:10.1016/j.pathol.2015.12.076.
- Mehta, Sunali; Shelling, Andrew; Muthukaruppan, Anita; Lasham, Annette; Blenkiron, Cherie; Laking, George; Print, Cristin (2010). "Predictive and prognostic molecular markers for cancer medicine". Therapeutic Advances in Medical Oncology. 2 (2): 125–148. doi:10.1177/1758834009360519. ISSN 1758-8359. PMC 3126011. PMID 21789130.
