= Resilience to Nature's Challenges =

Collaborative natural hazards research programme in New Zealand (2015–2024)

- Resilience to Nature's Challenges National Science Challenge
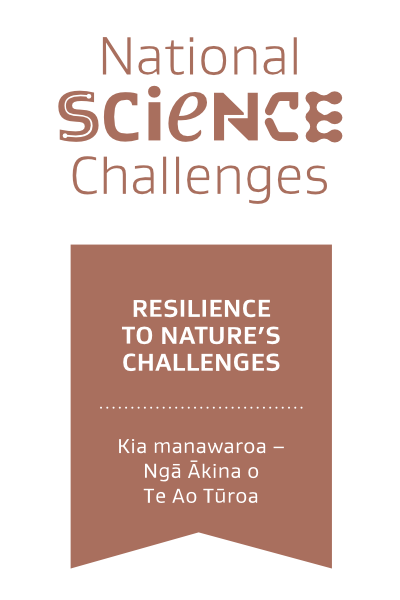
- Established: 2015
- Type: Research programme
- Location: New Zealand
- Director: Richard Smith
- Budget: $59.4 m NZD
- Funding: MBIE
- Website: resiliencechallenge.nz

Resilience to Nature's Challenges (Māori: Kia manawaroa – Ngā Ākina o Te Ao Tūroa) was one of New Zealand's eleven collaborative research programmes known as National Science Challenges. Running from 2015 to 2024, the focus of Resilience to Nature's Challenges (RNC) research was enhancing New Zealand's resilience to natural hazards such as sea level rise, climate change, wildfire, and volcanoes.

== Establishment and governance ==
The New Zealand Government agreed in August 2012 to fund National Science Challenges: large multi-year collaborative research programmes that would address important issues in New Zealand's future. The funding criteria were set out in January 2014, with proposals assessed by a Science Board within the Ministry of Business, Innovation, and Employment (MBIE).

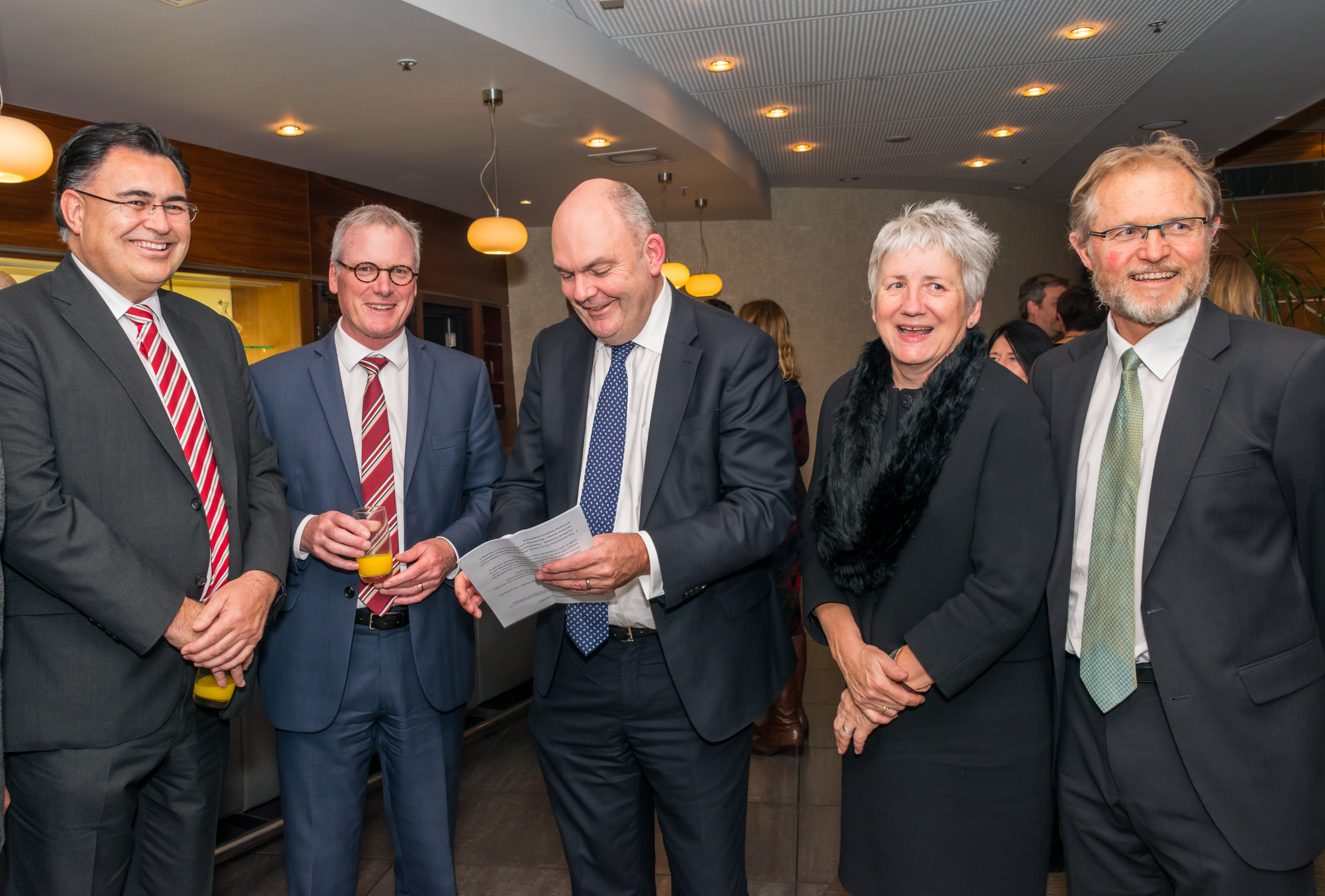
Official launch of Resilience to Nature's Challenges in March 2015; Science and Innovation Minister Steven Joyce centre

After a planning phase in 2014, MBIE approved the Crown Research Institute GNS Science as a host for the project. RNC was launched in March 2015 by Minister for Science and Innovation Steven Joyce, with interim Director Shane Cronin. The Māori name of Resilience to Nature's Challenges translates as Kia manawaroa (resilience) Ngā āki (-na) (challenges) [o Te] Ao Tūroa (of the enduring world).

RNC was hosted by GNS Science, with twelve other New Zealand research partners: BRANZ, Opus International, Resilient Organisations Ltd, Market Economics Ltd, the University of Auckland, University of Canterbury, University of Otago, Massey University, Lincoln University, Victoria University of Wellington, Scion, and NIWA. The Challenge involved 90 researchers and had an initial four-year allocation of $19.6 million.

RNC was set up around two major themes: Understanding Hazard and Risk (with research programmes on coastal hazards, volcanoes, weather and wildfires, and earthquakes and tsunamis), and Accelerating Resilience (incorporating research on both rural and urban communities, built environments, and Whanake te Kura i Tawhiti Nui—applying traditional Māori knowledge to hazard resilience).

In December 2018 the structure was adjusted, adding two research models (Multihazard Risk and Resilience in Practice) to the research programmes Rural, Urban, Māori, Built, Coastal, Weather, Earthquake/Tsunami and Volcanism, under the Understanding Risk and Accelerating Resilience themes.

== Research ==
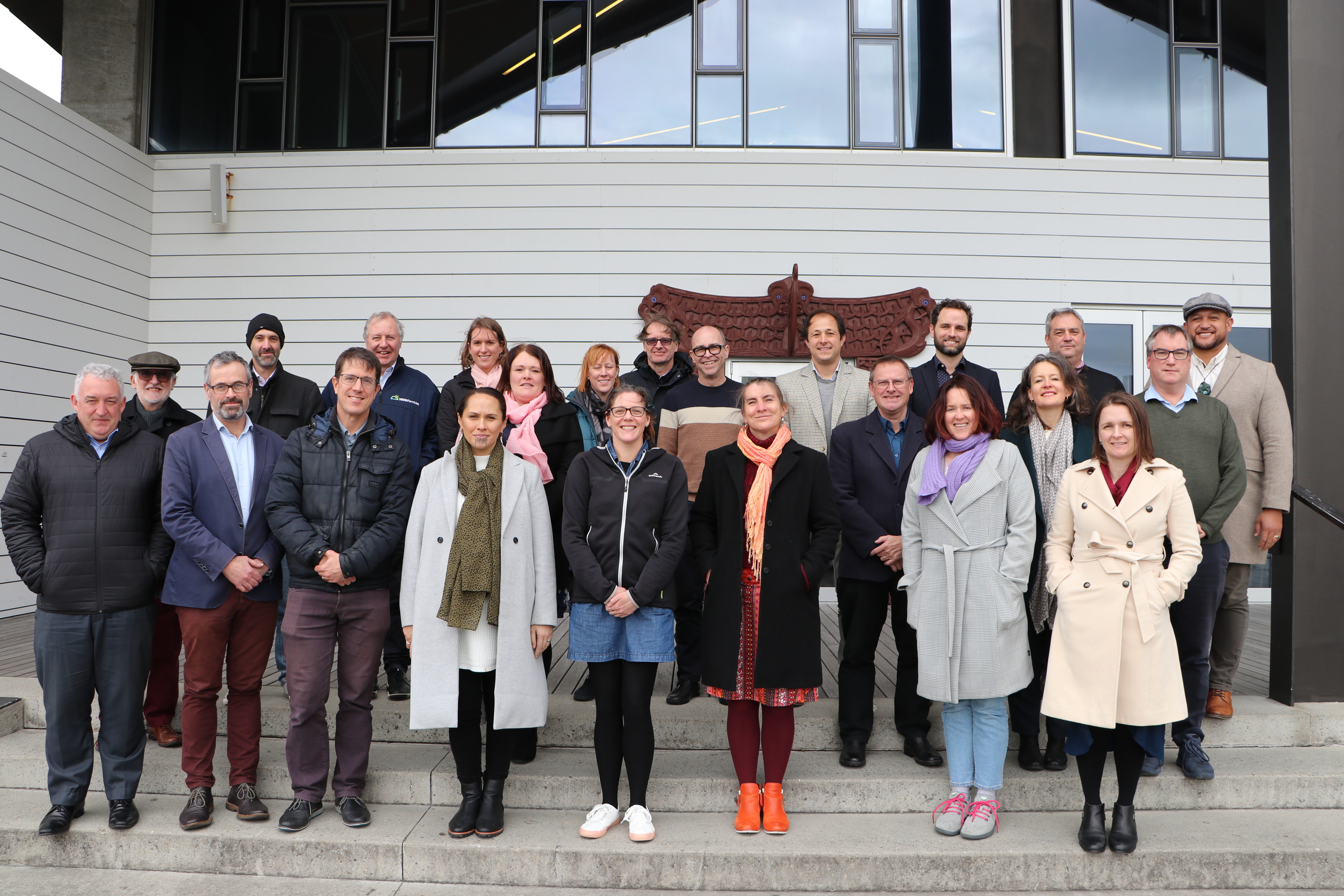
Resilience to Nature's Challenges Governance Group and science leaders hui, July 2021

One event that shaped RNC's research programme was the 2016 Kaikōura earthquake, which severed critical infrastructure in Marlborough and isolated the town of Kaikōura and forced scientists to examine how they should adjust their research efforts following a natural disaster. Researchers studied the impact of the earthquake on three waters systems, on the South Island's road network, on the Kaikōura community and its subsequent recovery, and the implications for Wellington's earthquake resilience.

The Earthquakes and Tsunamis programme developed New Zealand's first earthquake cycle simulator, generating a catalogue of ruptures going back hundreds of thousands of years on all of the country's major faults. The computer model generated clusters of large seismic events, and revealed ways that the rupture of a deep fault can trigger earthquakes on shallow faults.

== Symposia ==
In May 2021 RNC co-organised the symposium Growing Kai under Increasing Dry at Te Papa with the Our Land and Water and Deep South science challenges, to examine the long-term changes need in New Zealand farming practice to cope with climate change.

In June 2024 RNC organised a final symposium, Te Tai Whanake, at Te Papa to celebrate ten years of research from the science challenge.
