= Harold Wellman =

New Zealand geologist (1909–1999)

- Born: Harold William Wellman; 25 March 1909; Devonport, England
- Died: 28 April 1999 (aged 90)
- Known for: Discovery of the Alpine Fault
- Spouse: Joan Evelyn Butler
- Scientific career
- Fields: Geology
- Doctoral students: Roger Cooper

Harold William Wellman (25 March 1909 – 28 April 1999) was a New Zealand geologist known for his work on plate tectonics. He is notable for his discovery of South Island's Alpine Fault. Wellman became a Fellow of the Royal Society of New Zealand in 1954, and was awarded the Hector Memorial Medal and Prize in 1957 and the McKay Hammer Award in 1959.

== Life and career ==
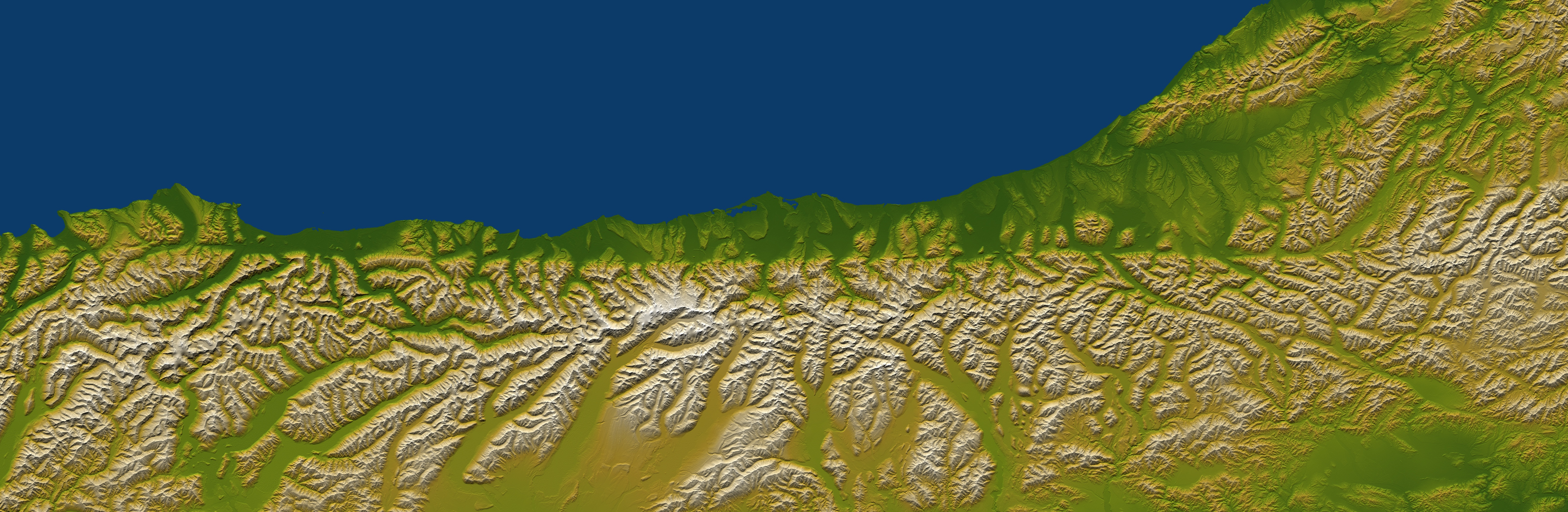
Elevation map of the west coast of New Zealand's South Island showing the sharp line formed by the Alpine Fault. North is to the right.

Harold Wellman was born in Devonport, England, to Evan Edward Wellman, an engineer in the Royal Navy, and May Kinglake Hoare. In 1927, his father was deployed at Devonport, Auckland, New Zealand for three years and the family moved to New Zealand. Harold Wellman first worked as a surveyor, but was soon forced to become a gold prospector on the West Coast due to the lack of work available during the depression.

In the mid-1930s, Wellman began his geological study while working in mineral exploration for the Department of Scientific and Industrial Research. He initially studied at Canterbury University, later moving to Victoria University where he completed his Bachelor of Science (1939) and Master of Science (1941). That same year he married Joan Evelyn Butler in Dunedin, with whom he had three children.

Between 1952 and 1958, he worked for the New Zealand Geological Survey based in Wellington. During this time he received major awards for his research, gaining a fellowship from the Royal Society of New Zealand in 1954, an honorary Doctor of Sciences from the University of New Zealand in 1956 and he was awarded the Royal Society's Hector Memorial Medal and Prize in 1957. He later joined the Department of Geology at Victoria University, becoming chair in 1970 and an emeritus professor in 1975.

== Works and discoveries ==
During his career Harold Wellman published on a wide variety of geological topics, however, he was most influential in discovering the Alpine Fault and its importance to New Zealand's geology. In 1940 Harold Wellman first identified that the Southern Alps was related to a fault line which ran for approximately 650 km (400 miles). The fault was officially named the Alpine Fault in 1942. At the same time, Harold Wellman proposed the 480 km (300 miles) lateral displacement on the Alpine Fault.

This displacement was inferred by Harold Wellman due in part to the similarity of rocks in Southland and Nelson on either side of the Alpine Fault. Lateral displacements of this magnitude could not be explained by pre-plate tectonics geology and his ideas were not initially widely accepted until 1956. Wellman also proposed in 1964 that the Alpine Fault was a Cenozoic structure, which was in conflict with the older Mesozoic age accepted at the time. This idea coupled with the displacement on the fault proposed that the Earth's surface was in relatively rapid constant movement and helped to overthrow the old geosynclinal hypothesis in favour of plate tectonics.
