= Science for Technological Innovation =

High-technology research programme in New Zealand (2015–2024)

- Science for Technological Innovation National Science Challenge
- Established: 2015
- Type: Research programme
- Location: New Zealand
- Director: Sally Davenport
- Budget: $106 m NZD
- Funding: MBIE
- Website: www.sftichallenge.govt.nz

Science for Technological Innovation (Māori: Kia kotahi mai - Te Ao Pūtaiao me Te Ao Hangarau) was one of New Zealand's eleven collaborative research programmes known as National Science Challenges. Running from 2015 to 2024, the focus of Science for Technological Innovation (SfTI) research was physical science and engineering research for New Zealand's economic growth.

== Establishment and governance ==
The New Zealand Government agreed in August 2012 to fund National Science Challenges: large multi-year collaborative research programmes that would address critical issues in New Zealand's future. The funding criteria were set out in January 2014, with proposals assessed by a Science Board within the Ministry of Business, Innovation, and Employment (MBIE). After a planning phase in 2014, MBIE approved the Crown Research Institute Callaghan Innovation as a host for the project. SfTI was formally launched on 16 September 2015 by the Minister for Science and Innovation Steven Joyce; its inaugural director was Margaret Hyland. The Māori name of Science for Technological Innovation translates as Kia kotahi mai (bringing together) Te Ao Pūtaiao (the world of science) Te Ao Hangarau (the world of innovation).

RNC was hosted by Callaghan Innovation, with twelve other New Zealand research partners: the University of Auckland, University of Canterbury, University of Otago, Massey University, Lincoln University, Victoria University of Wellington, University of Waikato, AUT, GNS Science, AgResearch, Scion, and Lincoln Agritech. The Challenge involved over 285 researchers over 36 organisations. In November 2018 the project received a second tranch of funding, totaling $72.7 million.

== Research ==
Connected for Innovation, a short documentary on SfTI research

SfTI's research focus was fourfold: hi-tech materials; manufacturing and design; IT data analytics and modelling; and sensor, robotics and automation. One of its projects was the development of needle-free injections for people with diabetes. Another was the development of a remotely-operated submersible to monitor mussel aquaculture.
