= Roger Cooper (paleontologist) =

New Zealand paleontologist (1939–2020)

- Born: Roger Alan Cooper; 12 March 1939
- Died: 2 March 2020 (aged 80); Lower Hutt, New Zealand
- Education: Victoria University of Wellington
- Awards: McKay Hammer Award (1980); New Zealand Science and Technology Silver Medal (2003); Hutton Medal (2017)
- Scientific career
- Fields: Paleontology
- Thesis: Ordovician Biostratigraphy of North-West Nelson (1969)

Roger Alan Cooper FRSNZ (12 March 1939 – 2 March 2020) was a New Zealand paleontologist, known as a leading expert on the fossil zooplankton of the early Paleozoic and the paleobiology of Zealandia.

== Biography ==
Roger A. Cooper, the second of his parents' five children, grew up in Eastbourne, New Zealand. He became a geology student at Victoria University of Wellington and in his second year went in January 1961 as a field assistant on a trip lasting almost three months. The purpose of the trip, with four people, three pack horses, two-way radios, and rifles, was geological mapping of New Zealand's Marlborough Region. Nearly a year later, he participated in the Victoria University Antarctic Expedition (VUWAE 4) to the western edge of the Koettlitz Glacier and the mountainous parts of southern Victoria Land. Over a period of two months, the expedition members produced geological maps and made fossil collections. In 1961 he received his B.Sc. After completing his M.Sc. he spent a year mapping commercially useful limestone in the Otago and Southland regions for the New Zealand Geological Survey.

From 1963 to 1964, Cooper spent eighteen months on the United Nations Labuk Valley Project in Sabah, Borneo. The purpose of the Project was to investigate mineral resources in the Labuk region. Cooper collected geochemical samples in remote jungle areas. His Iban assistants were highly skilled in jungle lore and living off the land.

Upon his return from Borneo, he began work at the University of Victoria on his Ph.D. thesis. His thesis, supervised by Harold Wellman and Paul P. Vella (1926–2010), which involved Ordovician biostratigraphy and fossil graptolite species, including Isograptus caduceus. Cooper's thesis was favourably described in 1969 by the paleontologist Oliver Bulman. After completing his Ph.D. in 1969, Cooper became a Paleozoic paleontologist employed by the New Zealand Geological Survey in Lower Hutt. He led two Antarctican expeditions, one in 1974-1975 and the other in 1981–1982. With the support of a Nuffield Traveling Fellowship, awarded in 1979, he was on a leave of absence from the Geological Survey for 15 months studying graptolites at the Natural History Museum, London, and at the University of Cambridge. For eight years, starting in 1989, he was Chief Paleontologist at the Geological Survey (which was part of the Geophysical Division of the Department of Scientific and Industrial Research). He managed the transition from the Geological Survey to the Institute of Geological and Nuclear Sciences, which was completed in 1992. In 2005 the Institute of Geological and Nuclear Sciences was renamed GNS Science. In 2012 he retired from GNS Science after 42 years of employment. After his retirement, Cooper maintained an office at GNS Science and remained scientifically active.

Cooper was elected in 1988 a Fellow of the Royal Society Te Apārangi and during his career received several awards. He co-authored the current version of the geological map of the Nelson region.

Cooper was divorced from his first wife, Dorothy (Dot) Cooper. Upon his death he was survived by his second wife Robyn Cooper (m. 1991), his ex-wife, two children from his first marriage, two step-children, and several grandchildren.

== Selected publications ==
- Cooper, R. A. (1974). "Age of the Greenland and Waiuta Groups, South Island, New Zealand (Note)". New Zealand Journal of Geology and Geophysics. 17 (4): 955–962. Bibcode:1974NZJGG..17..955C. doi:10.1080/00288306.1974.10418235.
- Cooper, R. A. (1979). Ordovician geology and graptolite faunas of the Aorangi Mine area, north-west Nelson, New Zealand. Vol. 47. New Zealand Geological Survey Paleontological Bulletin.
- Cooper, R.A. (1989). "New Zealand tectonostratigraphic terranes and panbiogeography". New Zealand Journal of Zoology. 16 (4): 699–712. doi:10.1080/03014223.1989.10422928.
- Cooper, Roger A.; Millener, Philip R. (1993). "The New Zealand biota: Historical background and new research". Trends in Ecology & Evolution. 8 (12): 429–433. Bibcode:1993TEcoE...8..429C. doi:10.1016/0169-5347(93)90004-9. PMID 21236222.
- Cooper, Alan; Cooper, Roger A. (1997). "The Oligocene bottleneck and New Zealand biota: genetic record of a past environmental crisis". Proceedings of the Royal Society of London. Series B: Biological Sciences. 261 (1362): 293–302. doi:10.1098/rspb.1995.0150. ISSN 0962-8452. PMID 8587872. S2CID 29890825.<
- Münker, Carsten; Cooper, Roger (1999). "The Cambrian arc complex of the Takaka Terrane, New Zealand: An integrated stratigraphical, paleontological and geochemical approach". New Zealand Journal of Geology and Geophysics. 42 (3): 415–445. Bibcode:1999NZJGG..42..415M. doi:10.1080/00288306.1999.9514854.
- Cooper, R.A.; Crampton, J.S.; Raine, J.I.; Gradstein, F.M.; Morgans, H.E.; Sadler, P.M.; Strong, C.P.; Waghorn, D.; Wilson, G.J. (2001). "Quantitative biostratigraphy of the Taranaki Basin, New Zealand: a deterministic and probabilistic approach". AAPG Bulletin. 85 (8): 1469–1498.
- Crampton, J. S.; Beu, A. G.; Cooper, R. A.; Jones, C. M.; Marshall, B.; Maxwell, P. A. (2003). "Estimating the Rock Volume Bias in Paleobiodiversity Studies". Science. 301 (5631): 358–360. Bibcode:2003Sci...301..358C. doi:10.1126/science.1085075. PMID 12805555. S2CID 38525949.
- Crampton, J. S.; Foote, M.; Beu, A. G.; Cooper, R. A.; Matcham, I.; Jones, C. M.; Maxwell, P. A.; Marshall, B. A. (2006). "Second-Order Sequence Stratigraphic Controls on the Quality of the Fossil Record at an Active Margin: New Zealand Eocene to Recent Shelf Molluscs". PALAIOS. 21 (1): 86–105. Bibcode:2006Palai..21...86C. doi:10.2110/palo.2004.p04-90. S2CID 53476400.
- Raine, J.I.; Beu, A.G.; Boyes, A.F.; Campbell, H.J.; Cooper, R.A.; Crampton, J.S.; Crundwell, M.P.; Hollis, C.J.; Morgans, H.E.G.; Mortimer, N. (2015). "New Zealand geological timescale NZGT 2015/1". New Zealand Journal of Geology and Geophysics. 58 (4): 398–403. Bibcode:2015NZJGG..58..398R. doi:10.1080/00288306.2015.1086391. S2CID 131209497.
