= Terry L. Hunt =

American anthropologist and archaeologist

- Education: University of Hawai'i–Hilo (BA); University of Auckland (MA); University of Washington (PhD)
- Known for: Research on Rapa Nui settlement chronology, moai transport, and deforestation
- Notable work: The Statues That Walked (2011)
- Scientific career
- Fields: Anthropology, archaeology, Pacific Islands prehistory
- Institutions: University of Hawai'i at Mānoa; University of Oregon; University of Arizona
- Thesis: Lapita Ceramic Exchange in the Mussau Islands, Papua New Guinea

Terry L. Hunt is an American anthropologist and archaeologist who specializes in the human and environmental history of the Pacific Islands. He is a professor in the School of Anthropology at the University of Arizona and dean emeritus of the university's W.A. Franke Honors College. Hunt is best known for research conducted with Carl P. Lipo that challenges the conventional "ecocide" narrative of Rapa Nui (Easter Island), including work on the island's settlement chronology, the transport of its moai statues, and the causes of its deforestation.

== Education ==
Hunt received his Bachelor of Arts from the University of Hawai'i–Hilo and a Master of Arts with honours from the University of Auckland. He completed his PhD in anthropology at the University of Washington with a dissertation on Lapita ceramic exchange in the Mussau Islands, Papua New Guinea.

== Academic career ==
Hunt taught at the University of Hawai'i at Mānoa for twenty-five years, serving for three of them as director of the university's honors program and as director of the University of Hawai'i Rapa Nui Archaeological Field School.

In 2013 he became dean of the Robert D. Clark Honors College at the University of Oregon. He was named dean of the Honors College at the University of Arizona in 2017, assuming the post that September. In October 2021 the college was renamed the W.A. Franke Honors College following a $25 million gift from Bill and Carolyn Franke, and Hunt became its inaugural Franke Dean. He stepped down as dean effective 1 July 2022 and returned to full-time teaching and research as a professor in the university's School of Anthropology, holding the title of dean emeritus.

Hunt has conducted field research in the Pacific for more than four decades and has led study-abroad courses to Rapa Nui in which students participate in his fieldwork.

== Research ==
=== Settlement chronology and the "ecocide" debate ===
In the early 2000s Hunt and Lipo excavated at Anakena, a sandy beach on the northern shore of Rapa Nui that they judged likely to be among the island's earliest settlement sites. Their radiocarbon results supported a comparatively late Polynesian arrival of roughly 1200 CE, considerably later than earlier estimates.

In a 2009 paper in Pacific Science, Hunt and Lipo argued that although deforestation and biodiversity loss did occur on the island, the demographic and cultural collapse widely attributed to pre-contact environmental mismanagement in fact followed European contact and the introduction of Old World diseases. The argument contested the account popularized by Jared Diamond in Collapse, which had presented the island as a parable of ecological self-destruction.

=== Transport of the moai ===
With Lipo and Sergio Rapu Haoa, Hunt published a 2012 paper in the Journal of Archaeological Science proposing that the island's megalithic statues were moved upright, rocked from side to side with ropes, rather than dragged horizontally on log rollers or sledges. The research was the subject of a National Geographic cover story in July 2012 and of a NOVA–National Geographic television documentary broadcast on PBS in November 2012.

To test the hypothesis the researchers built a 4.35-tonne concrete replica scaled from a road moai; a team of eighteen people moved it 100 metres in 40 minutes.

A follow-up study published in 2025 surveyed 962 moai, focusing on 62 statues abandoned along the island's ancient transport roads. These "road moai" share a wide D-shaped base and a forward lean of approximately 6 to 15 degrees, features the authors interpret as design adaptations for rocking transport. The paper combined statistical analysis, high-resolution 3D modelling and further experimental trials, and responded systematically to critiques concerning terrain, rope availability, weathering patterns and alternative transport mechanisms.

Reception was mixed. Sue Hamilton of University College London, who was not involved in the research, described it as a worthwhile contribution to the debate but cautioned that it demonstrates the technical possibility of upright transport without establishing that the method was used, and suggested that differences among road moai might instead reflect ceremonial function or variation in craftsmanship.

=== Rats and deforestation ===
Hunt has argued that the Polynesian rat (Rattus exulans), introduced to Rapa Nui by the first settlers, played a substantially larger role in the island's deforestation than had generally been recognised. In a 2025 paper in the Journal of Archaeological Science, Hunt and Lipo used ecological modelling to argue that a single breeding pair could have produced a population of up to 11.2 million rats within 47 years, consuming roughly 95 percent of palm seeds and suppressing forest regeneration. The island is estimated to have supported between 15 and 19.7 million Paschalococos disperta palms before vegetation shifted to grasses and shrubs between about 1200 and 1650 CE. Hunt has characterised the findings as recasting the ecocide narrative as a story of biological invasion accelerated by human land clearance with fire.

== Selected publications ==
- Hunt, Terry L.; Lipo, Carl P. (2011). The Statues That Walked: Unraveling the Mystery of Easter Island. New York: Free Press. ISBN 978-1439150313. — recipient of the Society for American Archaeology Book of the Year award in the public audience category.
- Cochrane, Ethan E.; Hunt, Terry L., eds. (2018). The Oxford Handbook of Oceanic Prehistory. Oxford: Oxford University Press.
- Hunt, Terry L.; Lipo, Carl P. (2009). "Revisiting Rapa Nui (Easter Island) "Ecocide"". Pacific Science. 63 (4): 601–616. Bibcode:2009PacSc..63..601H. doi:10.2984/049.063.0407. hdl:10125/22778.
- Hunt, Terry L.; Lipo, Carl P. (2025). "Reassessing the role of Polynesian rats (Rattus exulans) in Rapa Nui (Easter Island) deforestation: Faunal evidence and ecological modeling". Journal of Archaeological Science. 184 106388. Bibcode:2025JArSc.18406388H. doi:10.1016/j.jas.2025.106388.
- Lipo, Carl P.; Hunt, Terry L.; Rapu Haoa, Sergio (2013). "The 'walking' megalithic statues (moai) of Easter Island". Journal of Archaeological Science. 40 (6): 2859–2866. Bibcode:2013JArSc..40.2859L. doi:10.1016/j.jas.2012.09.029.
- Lipo, Carl P.; Hunt, Terry L. (2025). "The walking moai hypothesis: Archaeological evidence, experimental validation, and response to critics". Journal of Archaeological Science. 183 106383. Bibcode:2025JArSc.18306383L. doi:10.1016/j.jas.2025.106383.
