= Richard McDowell =

New Zealand agricultural scientist

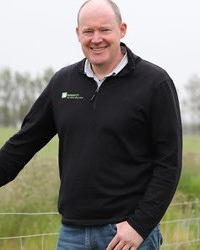
- Born: Richard William McDowell; Invercargill, New Zealand
- Education: University of Cambridge
- Children: 1
- Awards: Hutton Medal (2021)
- Scientific career
- Fields: Soil science Freshwater science
- Workplaces: Lincoln University
- Thesis: Processes involved in controlling phosphorus release to surface and sub-surface runoff (2000)
- Website: McDowell at Google Scholar

Richard William McDowell (born 29 June 1973) is a New Zealand freshwater and soil scientist and former first-class cricketer. A professor at Lincoln University, McDowell was awarded the Hutton Medal of the Royal Society Te Apārangi in 2021.

== Biography ==
McDowell was born at Invercargill on 29 June 1973. He studied in New Zealand at Lincoln University, graduating with a Bachelor of Science with first-class honours in 1996, before studying in England for his PhD at the University of Cambridge. His doctoral thesis, completed in 2000, was titled Processes involved in controlling phosphorus release to surface and sub-surface runoff.

While studying at Cambridge, McDowell played first-class cricket as a middle-order batsman for Cambridge University in 1999, making a single appearance against Kent at Fenner's.

Since returning to New Zealand, McDowell has had a prominent role in the field of land and water resources, becoming a principal scientist at AgResearch. In 2010 he was appointed an adjunct professor and in 2014 he was made a full professor in the Department of Soil and Physical Sciences at Lincoln University. In 2014, he was appointed chief scientist of the National Science Challenge: Our Land and Water. In June 2021, McDowell was appointed editor-in-chief of the Journal of the Royal Society of New Zealand, and made a director of the Queen Elizabeth II National Trust in 2024.

In 2017, McDowell was elected a Fellow of the Royal Society of New Zealand in 2017. He is also a Fellow of the New Zealand and British Societies of Soil Science. In November 2021, he was awarded the Hutton Medal by the Royal Society Te Apārangi, for his work on nutrient flows from land to water.
