= Clíona Ní Mhurchú =

New Zealand professor of population nutrition

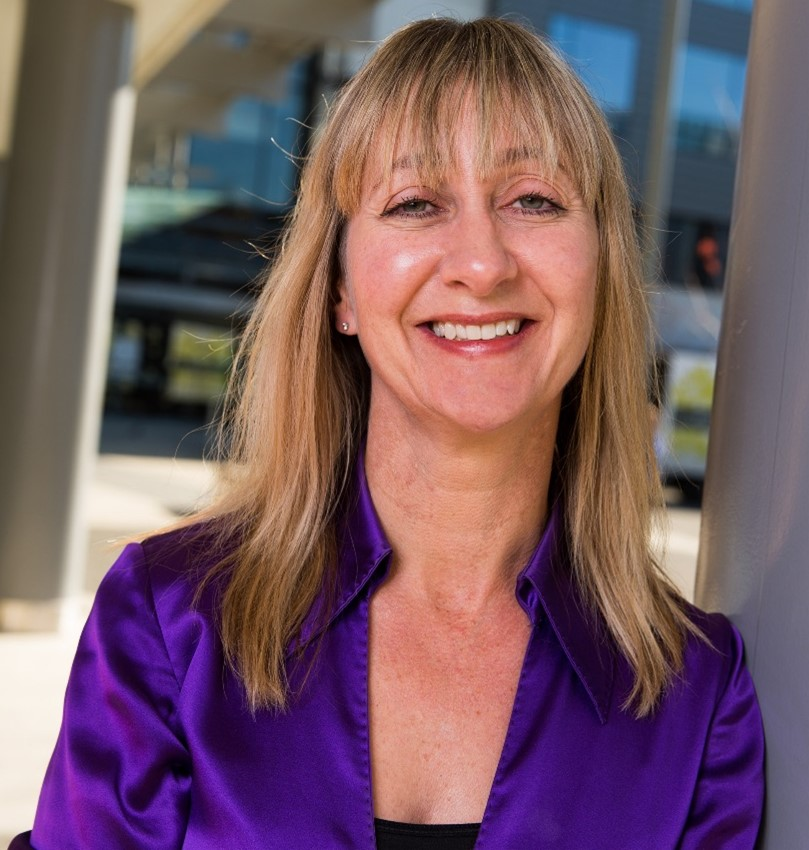
- Ní Mhurchú in 2023
- Born: Dublin
- Education: University of Southampton
- Scientific career
- Fields: population nutrition
- Workplaces: University of Auckland
- Thesis: Effectiveness of motivational interviewing in dietary education for people with hyperlipidaemia (1997)

Clíona Ní Mhurchú is a New Zealand population nutrition academic. She is currently a professor at the University of Auckland and Nutrition Lead at the National Institute for Health Innovation.

== Career ==
After training at Trinity College Dublin and receiving a PhD from the University of Southampton with the thesis Effectiveness of motivational interviewing in dietary education for people with hyperlipidaemia, Ní Mhurchú stated work at the University of Auckland where she rose to full professor.

In 1999-02 and 2010–13 Ní Mhurchú received funding from the Heart Foundation of New Zealand and she is on a number of national and international technical advisory groups.

Her research regularly gets covered in the mainstream New Zealand press.

== Selected works ==
- Anderson, Craig; Sally Rubenach; Cliona Ni Mhurchu; Michael Clark; Carol Spencer, and Adrian Winsor. "Home or hospital for stroke rehabilitation? Results of a randomized controlled trial." Stroke 31, no. 5 (2000): 1024–1031.
- James, W. Philip T., Rachel Jackson-Leach, Cliona Ni Mhurchu, Eleni Kalamara, Maryam Shayeghi, Neville J. Rigby, Chizuru Nishida, and Anthony Rodgers. "Overweight and obesity (high body mass index)." Comparative quantification of health risks: global and regional burden of disease attribution to selected major risk factors 1 (2004): 497–596.
- Maddison, Ralph, Cliona Ni Mhurchu, Andrew Jull, Yannan Jiang, Harry Prapavessis, and Anthony Rodgers. "Energy expended playing video console games: an opportunity to increase children’s physical activity?." Pediatric exercise science 19, no. 3 (2007): 334–343.
- Utter, Jennifer, Robert Scragg, Cliona Ni Mhurchu, and David Schaaf. "At-home breakfast consumption among New Zealand children: associations with body mass index and related nutrition behaviors." Journal of the American Dietetic Association 107, no. 4 (2007): 570–576.
- Maddison, Ralph, Louise Foley, Cliona Ni Mhurchu, Yannan Jiang, Andrew Jull, Harry Prapavessis, Maea Hohepa, and Anthony Rodgers. "Effects of active video games on body composition: a randomized controlled trial." The American Journal of Clinical Nutrition 94, no. 1 (2011): 156–163.
