= National Science Challenges =

Eleven collaborative research programmes in New Zealand (2014–2024)

- Established: 2014
- Type: Research programme
- Location: New Zealand
- Budget: $NZ680m
- Funding: MBIE
- Website: www.mbie.govt.nz/science-and-technology/science-and-innovation/funding-information-and-opportunities/investment-funds/national-science-challenges/

The National Science Challenges (NSC) were 11 ten-year collaborative science programmes in New Zealand, established in 2014 and ending mid-2024. They were "cross-disciplinary, mission-led programmes designed to tackle New Zealand's biggest science-based challenges", funded through the Ministry of Business, Innovation and Employment.

== Establishment ==
The NSC initiative was developed over 2012–13 by the New Zealand government's Ministry of Business, Innovation and Employment (MBIE) as a restructure of national scientific research funding. Established in advance of the 2014 general election, the Challenges were funded with $680.8 million over ten years, broken into two five-year phases. The science challenges they address were intended to be "the most important national-scale issues facing New Zealand". The challenges were collaborative and multi-disciplinary, creating new teams of researchers drawn from universities and other research institutions, iwi, Crown Research Institutes, businesses, community organisations, and NGOs.

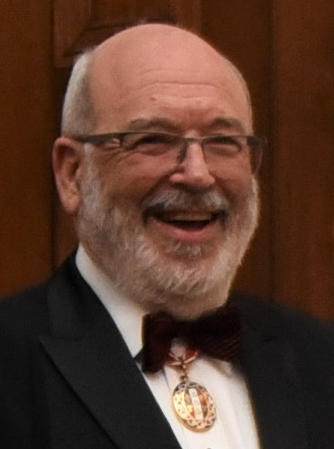
Sir Peter Gluckman

The Challenges shared five principles, summarised by MBIE as:

1. Mission-led
2. Science quality
3. Best research team collaboration
4. Stakeholder engagement & public participation
5. Māori involvement and mātauranga

The selection process involved a period of public consultation over late 2012–early 2013, and then selection by a "peak panel" of researchers, chaired by Peter Gluckman. The selection panel consisted of William Denny, Ian Ferguson, Peter Hunter, Mary O’Kane, Jacqueline Rowarth, Richie Poulton, Charles Royal, David Penman, Elf Eldridge, and Rachael Wiltshire.

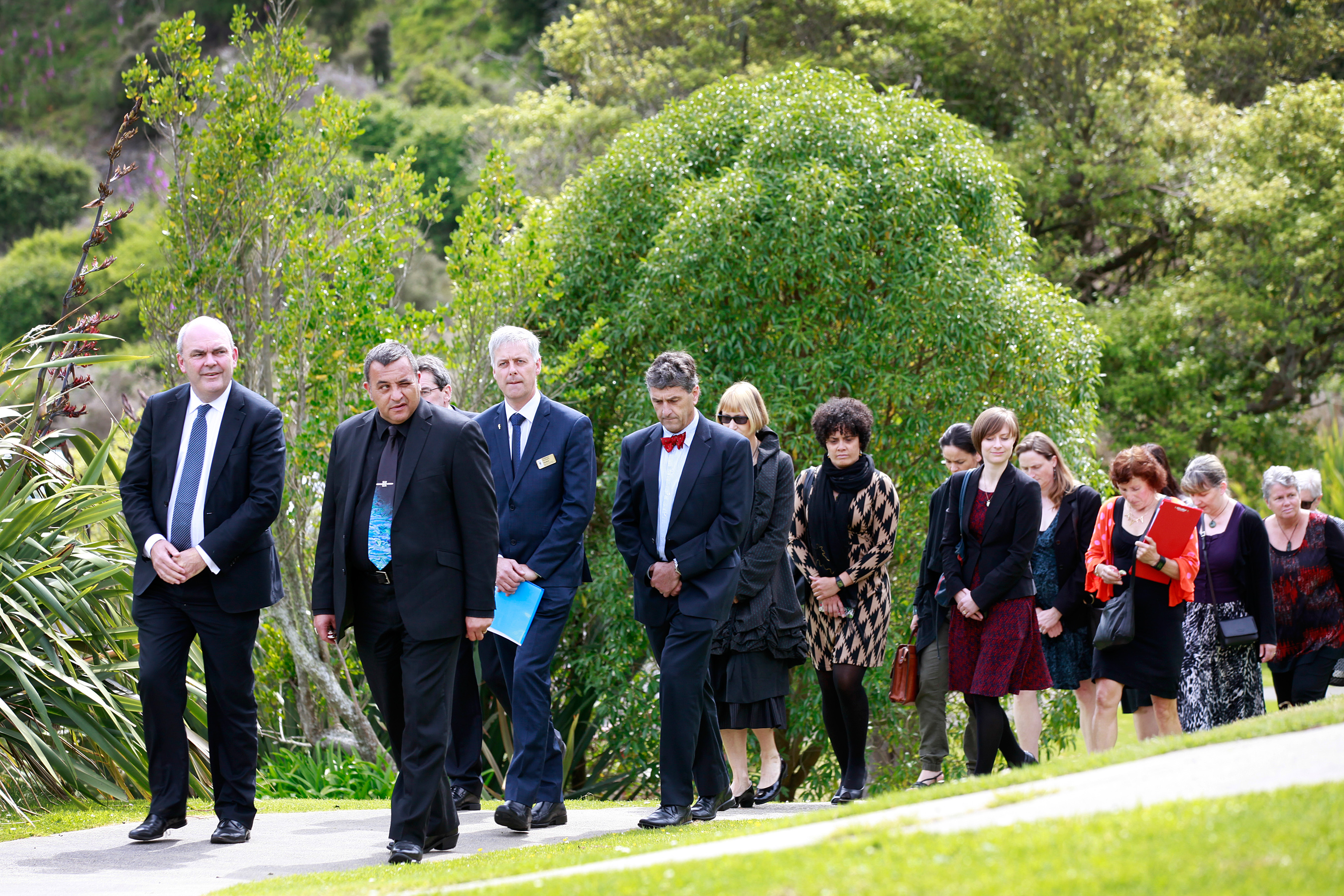
Launch of Healthier Lives – He Oranga Hauora National Science Challenge at Ōtākou Marae on 4 December 2015; Minister for Science and Innovation Steven Joyce on far left

The first phase of funding from 2013 to 2018 led to eleven Challenges being established beginning in 2014; the last was launched on 5 May 2016. At the midway review in 2018 the Challenges received their second tranche of funding ($320 million) to last from 1 July 2019 to 30 June 2024.

Expert reaction to the review highlighted concerns over the way the challenges were initially selected, and whether the cost of governance means more could have been achieved through investing in existing funding mechanisms. The president of the New Zealand Association of Scientists, Heide Friedrich, said “The New Zealand Association of Scientists has concerns if the review process asked the right questions, given the recommendation is to approve the second tranche of funding without changes." Shaun Hendy commented that "After some public input, the National Science Challenges were more or less selected by a panel led by Sir Peter Gluckman but most of us still find this process rather mysterious."

A 2016 critique of the programme asserted that although "Māori involvement and mātauranga" was one of the core principles of their establishment, the National Science Challenges "moved to marginalize input by Māori researchers. Māori research approaches and complaints were recorded by the MBIE in NSC documents, but not substantively addressed". Subsequently the organisation Rauika Māngai was created, a group of Māori researchers representing the eleven National Science Challenges and Ngā Pae o te Māramatanga (Aotearoa New Zealand's Centre of Māori Research Excellence). Rauika Māngai worked with the Challenges to improve partnerships with Māori communities and implement the 2020 Vision Mātauranga policy.

== Challenges ==
Challenge	Launch date	Funding	Host	Website
A Better Start, E Tipu e Rea; Improving the potential for young New Zealanders to have healthy and successful lives.	19 February 2016	Up to $34.7 million over 10 years	University of Auckland	http://www.abetterstart.nz/
Ageing Well, Kia eke kairangi ki te taikaumātuatanga Sustaining health and well-being as people age, enabling all New Zealanders to reach their full potential into the later years of life.	4 March 2015	Initial: Up to $34.9 million over 10 years. Midway review: $20.3M (July 2019 – June 2024)	University of Otago	http://www.ageingwellchallenge.co.nz/
Building Better Homes, Towns and Cities, Ko ngā wā kāinga hei whakamāhorahora Improving the quality and supply of housing and create smart and attractive urban environments.	5 May 2016	Up to $47.9 million over 10 years	BRANZ	http://www.buildingbetter.nz/
Healthier Lives – He Oranga Hauora; Researching how to significantly reducing the death and disease burden of some of New Zealand's leading health problems.	4 December 2015	Up to $31.3 million over 10 years	University of Otago	https://healthierlives.co.nz/
High-Value Nutrition, Ko Ngā Kai Whai Painga; Developing high-value foods with validated health benefits to drive economic growth.	1 April 2014	Up to $83.8 million over 10 years	University of Auckland	http://www.highvaluenutrition.co.nz/
New Zealand's Biological Heritage, Ngā Koiora Tuku Iho; Protecting and managing New Zealand's biodiversity, improve our biosecurity, and enhance our resilience to harmful organisms.	29 August 2014	Up to $63.7 million over 10 years	Landcare Research	http://www.biologicalheritage.nz/
Our Land and Water, Toitū te Whenua, Toiora te Wai; Enhancing the production and productivity of New Zealand's primary sector, while maintaining and improving the quality of the country's land and water for future generations.	26 January 2016	Up to $96.9 million over 10 years	AgResearch	http://www.ourlandandwater.nz/
Resilience to Nature's Challenges, Kia manawaroa – Ngā Ākina o Te Ao Tūroa; Enhancing New Zealand's ability to anticipate, adapt and thrive in the face of ever-changing natural hazards.	30 June 2015	Up to $59.4 million over 10 years	Institute of Geological and Nuclear Science	http://resiliencechallenge.nz/
Science for Technological Innovation, Kia kotahi mai – Te Ao Pūtaiao me Te Ao Hangarau; Tackling New Zealand's big high-tech challenges to grow the economy.	16 September 2015	Up to $106 million over 10 years. Midway review: $72.7m over five years.	Callaghan Innovation	http://www.sftichallenge.govt.nz/
Sustainable Seas, Ko ngā moana whakauka Enhancing the use of New Zealand marine resources within environmental and biological constraints.	4 September 2014	Up to $71.1 million over 10 years. Midway review: $39.8m over five years.	National Institute of Water and Atmospheric Research	http://sustainableseaschallenge.co.nz/
The Deep South, Te Kōmata o Te Tonga; Understanding the role of the Antarctic and Southern Ocean in determining New Zealand's future climate.	5 August 2014	Initial funding: Up to $51.1 million over 10 years. Midway review: $27.1m over five years	NIWA	http://www.deepsouthchallenge.co.nz/
