= List of state-owned enterprises of New Zealand =

New Zealand Crown companies

State-owned enterprises (SOEs) in New Zealand are registered companies listed under Schedules 1 and 2 of the State-Owned Enterprises Act 1986. Most SOEs are former government departments or agencies that were corporatised. They are responsible to the Minister for State Owned Enterprises.

Many other government-owned companies and statutory trading organisations are referred to informally as "state-owned enterprises" although they are not SOEs in the strictest sense. These are also listed here.

== Function ==
The function of SOEs is to operate successfully as a business, as profitable as those not owned by the Crown. The section of the Act defining this is usually interpreted as meaning that SOEs are expected to ready themselves for privatisation, though this is not always the case.

Two Ministers of the Crown act as the shareholding ministers in the company. In the case of SOEs these are usually the Minister for State Owned Enterprises (see article for list) and the Minister responsible for the particular company.

The Crown is assisted in the running of SOEs and other Crown-owned companies by the Treasury's Commercial Operations group (formerly the Crown Ownership Monitoring Unit).

== List of state enterprises ==
The state enterprises are listed in Schedule 1 of the State-owned Enterprises Act.

Name	Date created	Formerly	Notes
Airways New Zealand	1 April 1987	Part of the Ministry of Transport	Air traffic control and air navigation providers
Animal Control Products	1991		
AsureQuality	2007	ASURE NZ Ltd and AgriQuality Ltd	
Electricity Corporation of New Zealand	1 April 1987	NZE, NZED, State Hydro Department	Shell of previous electricity utility. Assets transferred to Contact, Genesis, Meridian, Mighty River
KiwiRail Holdings Limited	1 July 2008	Toll New Zealand (rolling stock and inter-island ferries) Ontrack (track and infrastructure)	Formerly New Zealand Rail (1990–1995), Tranz Rail (1995–2002), Toll New Zealand (2002–2008)
Kordia	1 July 1989	Subsidiary of Television New Zealand	Formerly Broadcast Communications Limited or BCL, renamed 2006.
Landcorp	1 April 1987	Commercial arm of Department of Survey and Land Information	
MetService	July 1992	Part of the Ministry of Transport	Known as MetService
NZ Post	1 April 1987	New Zealand Post Office	Telecom New Zealand, PostBank split off 1987.
New Zealand Railways Corporation	31 December 2012		Owns the land underneath KiwiRail's network
Quotable Value	2005	Valuation NZ	Property valuation, particularly for local authority rating purposes
Transpower New Zealand	1994	Subsidiary of Electricity Corporation of New Zealand	National grid operator

== State-(part-)owned enterprises ==
The following table lists entities that are monitored by Treasury, but are not state enterprises (see table above). For a more complete list of government entities and organisations, see Public sector organisations in New Zealand.

Name	Date created	Formerly	Government ownership	Notes
Accident Compensation Corporation				
AgResearch	1992	Ministry of Agriculture and Fisheries, DSIR		
Air New Zealand	1 April 1965	Tasman Empire Airways Limited, National Airways Corporation	51.95%	Largely privatised in 1989, government subsequently bought a 73% stake in 2001, and sold down to 53% in November 2013.
Christchurch Airport			25%	75% owned by Christchurch City Council
Crown Asset Management Limited				
Crown Fibre Holdings Limited				
Dunedin Airport	1989		50%	
Earthquake Commission	1945			
Genesis Energy Limited	1999	Part of Electricity Corporation of New Zealand	52.4%	Floated on the sharemarket April 2014.
Government Superannuation Fund Authority				
Guardians of New Zealand Superannuation				
Hawke's Bay Airport Limited				
Housing New Zealand Corporation				
Institute of Environmental Science and Research Limited	1992	DSIR		
Institute of Geological & Nuclear Sciences Limited	1992	DSIR		
Landcare Research New Zealand Limited				
Mercury Energy	1999	Part of Electricity Corporation of New Zealand	51.15%	Floated on the sharemarket in May 2013.
Meridian Energy	1999	Part of Electricity Corporation of New Zealand	51.02%	Floated on the sharemarket in October 2013.
National Institute of Water & Atmospheric Research Limited				
National Provident Fund				
Network for Learning Limited				
New Zealand Forest Research Institute Limited				
New Zealand Local Government Funding Agency				
New Zealand Lotteries Commission				
New Zealand Venture Investment Limited				
Public Trust				
Radio New Zealand				
Research and Education Advanced Network New Zealand Limited				
Southern Response Earthquake Services Limited				
Tamaki Redevelopment Company				
Television New Zealand				
The New Zealand Institute for Plant & Food Research Limited	1 December 2008	HortResearch and Crop and Food Research		

== Former state-owned enterprises ==
Former state-owned enterprises come in three forms – those removed from the Schedules of the Act and made Crown entities, those removed and not privatised, and those removed and privatised. Well-known SOEs that became Crown entity companies include broadcasting companies Television New Zealand (TVNZ) and Radio New Zealand (RNZ).

- Timberlands West Coast Limited, wound up in 2008
- Learning Media Limited, wound up in 2013
- Solid Energy, wound up in 2018

=== Privatised state-owned enterprises ===
Privatised state-owned enterprises include:

- Bank of New Zealand (BNZ); sold to National Australia Bank in 1992
- Contact Energy – sold to cornerstone shareholder and sharemarket float in 1999
- DFC New Zealand Limited – went bankrupt in 1989 and later liquidated
- Export Guarantee Office
- Fairway Resolutions
- GCS Limited – formerly Government Computing Services, purchased by EDS New Zealand
- Government Printing Office – became GP Print, Whitcoulls, Blue Star Group and Webstar
- Government Supply Brokerage Corporation (NZ) Limited
- Health Computing Service
- National Film Unit – purchased by Peter Jackson and renamed Park Road Post
- New Zealand Rail Limited (The rail operations of the Railways Corporation) – later renationalised as KiwiRail.
- New Zealand Steel Limited – purchased by BHP
- Post Office Bank Limited (Postbank) – sold to ANZ
- Radio New Zealand (Commercial Stations) – Sold to Clear Channel to form The Radio Network. Non-commercial stations RNZ National and RNZ Concert remain.
- Rural Banking and Finance Corporation – purchased by the National Bank of New Zealand)
- Shipping Corporation of New Zealand – sold to P&O, 1989
- State Insurance Office
- Telecom Corporation of New Zealand Limited – copper network later unbundled between 2006–2008
- Terralink International – GIS provider
- Tourist Hotel Corporation of New Zealand Limited
- Vehicle Testing New Zealand, sold in 1999 to the Motor Trade Association
- Works and Development Services Corporation New Zealand Ltd which remained in state ownership after the sale of Works Civil Construction Ltd to Downer & Company. Company has been struck off Companies Office register on 21 May 2005.

== Former, non-SOE state-owned corporations ==
- State Insurance
- Tourist Hotel Corporation
- Government Life Insurance Corporation – later renamed Tower Insurance
- National Airways Corporation – merged with Air New Zealand in 1980

== Other Crown-owned companies ==
Other, non-SOE Crown-owned companies are the Crown entity companies. These are the Crown Research Institutes (CRIs), the broadcasting companies Television New Zealand Limited (TVNZ) and Radio New Zealand Limited (RNZ), and the New Zealand Venture Investment Fund Limited.

== See also ==
- Constitutional economics
- Council-controlled organisation – a New Zealand local government equivalent
- Crown entity
- List of government-owned companies
- Political economy
- Public sector organisations in New Zealand (lists SOEs and Crown entities)

== External links and sources ==
- State-Owned Enterprises Act 1986 as consolidated and amended at the www.legislation.govt.nz site
  - Schedule 1 (State Enterprises), State-Owned Enterprises Act 1986 as amended
  - Schedule 2 (New State Enterprises), State-Owned Enterprises Act 1986 as amended
- State sector organisations at the State Services Commission site
