= Trish Fraser =

New Zealand soil scientist (1966–2025)

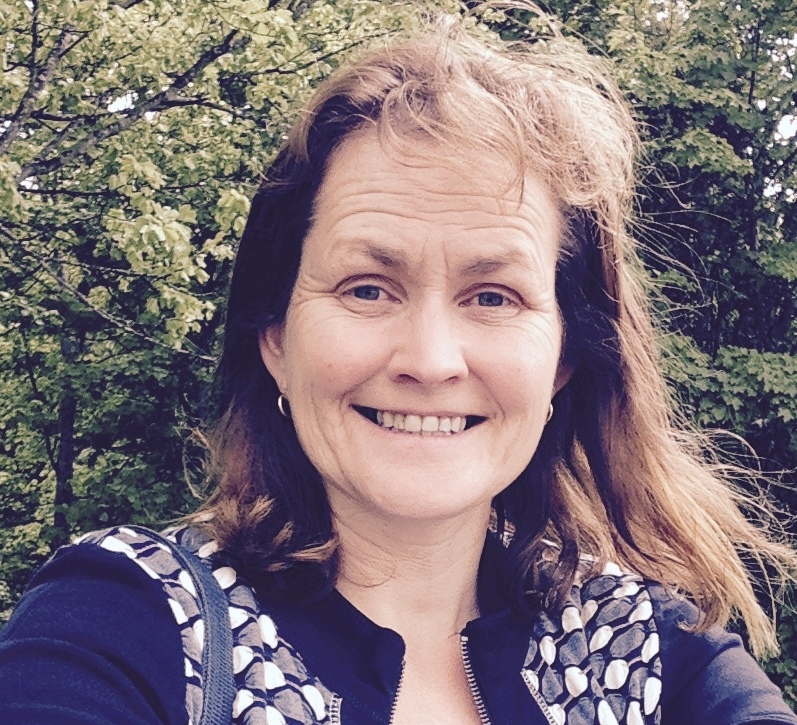
- Fraser in 2022
- Born: Patricia Margaret Fraser; 23 January 1966; Scotland
- Died: 24 April 2025 (aged 59); Leeston, New Zealand
- Education: University of Aberdeen; Lincoln University, New Zealand
- Spouse: Steve Kirsopp
- Children: 3
- Scientific career
- Fields: Nitrate leaching, soil quality
- Workplaces: Plant & Food Research
- Thesis: The fate of nitrogen under an animal urine patch (1992)
- Doctoral advisor: Keith Cameron; Rob Sherlock

Patricia Margaret Fraser (23 January 1966 – 24 April 2025) was a New Zealand soil scientist at Crown Research Institute Plant & Food Research in Lincoln. Her work focused on the role of earthworms in the soil, and nitrate leaching, to further understand soil quality in cropping systems. She won a 2020 New Zealand Woman of Influence Award in the rural category, and became a Fellow of the New Zealand Institute of Agricultural and Horticultural Science in 2024.

== Early life and education ==
Fraser grew up on a mixed cropping farm at Balvattie on the Black Isle in Scotland. She completed a Bachelor of Science degree at the University of Aberdeen in 1988, followed by a PhD from the Department of Soil and Physical Sciences at Lincoln University in 1992. Her doctoral thesis was titled The fate of nitrogen under an animal urine patch, and was supervised by Keith Cameron and Rob Sherlock.

== Research and professional service ==
Fraser researched nitrate leaching, cropping systems and the role of earthworms in soil quality.

Fraser played a significant role in the New Zealand Society of Soil Science for many years. She was a member from 1989, and was secretary for 20 years, vice-president for two years, and president from 2012 to 2014. She was the first woman to serve as president of the society.

== Awards ==
Fraser was awarded the Norman Taylor Memorial Award for outstanding service to New Zealand soil science in 2009. In 2015, Fraser was awarded the Researcher of the Year Award by the Foundation for Arable Research. She was a Fellow and a life member of the New Zealand Society of Soil Science.

Fraser won the Rural category of the Woman of Influence Awards in 2020. Her collaborative approach and unusual ability to communicate science to farmers were lauded by the judges. On receiving the award, Fraser said, "I never think of myself as a trailblazer, but in retrospect what I've done out of passion and interest did make an impact on the communities that I serve. When I first started as a soil scientist almost 30 years ago, the rural community was extremely dominated by men. I knew I must prove myself through the quality of my work. I attended many field days to communicate my findings and educate farmers on how to improve soil health. Gradually they've come around, and they now value and respect me for the work I've done."

In 2024, Fraser was nominated as a Fellow of the New Zealand Institute of Agricultural and Horticultural Science.

== Personal life and death ==
Fraser and her husband, Steve Kirsopp, had three children. They lived on a small farm close to the Selwyn River / Waikirikiri, and bred beef cattle.

Fraser died at Ellesmere Hospital in Leeston on 24 April 2025, at the age of 59.

== Selected publications ==
- K. C. Cameron; N. P. Smith; C. D. A. McLay; P. M. Fraser; R. J. McPherson; D. F. Harrison; P. Harbottle (September 1992). "Lysimeters Without Edge Flow: An Improved Design and Sampling Procedure". Soil Science Society of America Journal. 56 (5): 1625–1628. doi:10.2136/sssaj1992.03615995005600050048x. ISSN 0361-5995. Wikidata Q111085122.
- P.M. Fraser; P.H. Williams; R.J. Haynes (January 1996). "Earthworm species, population size and biomass under different cropping systems across the Canterbury Plains, New Zealand". Applied Soil Ecology. 3 (1): 49–57. doi:10.1016/0929-1393(95)00062-3. ISSN 0929-1393. Wikidata Q111085124.
- G.S Francis; P.M Fraser (October 1998). "The effects of three earthworm species on soil macroporosity and hydraulic conductivity". Applied Soil Ecology. 10 (1–2): 11–19. doi:10.1016/s0929-1393(98)00045-6. ISSN 0929-1393. Wikidata Q111085125.
- P. M. Fraser; R. J. Haynes; P. H. Williams (March 1994). "Effects of pasture improvement and intensive cultivation on microbial biomass, enzyme activities, and composition and size of earthworm populations". Biology and Fertility of Soils. 17 (3): 185–190. doi:10.1007/bf00336320. ISSN 0178-2762. Wikidata Q111085126.
- P. M. Fraser; D. Curtin; T. Harrison-Kirk; E. D. Meenken; M. H. Beare; F. Tabley; R. N. Gillespie; G. S. Francis (24 June 2013). "Winter Nitrate Leaching under Different Tillage and Winter Cover Crop Management Practices". Soil Science Society of America Journal. 77 (4): 1391–1401. doi:10.2136/sssaj2012.0256. ISSN 0361-5995. Wikidata Q111085129.
