= Plant & Food Research =

New Zealand Crown Research Institute

- Rangahau Ahumāra Kai

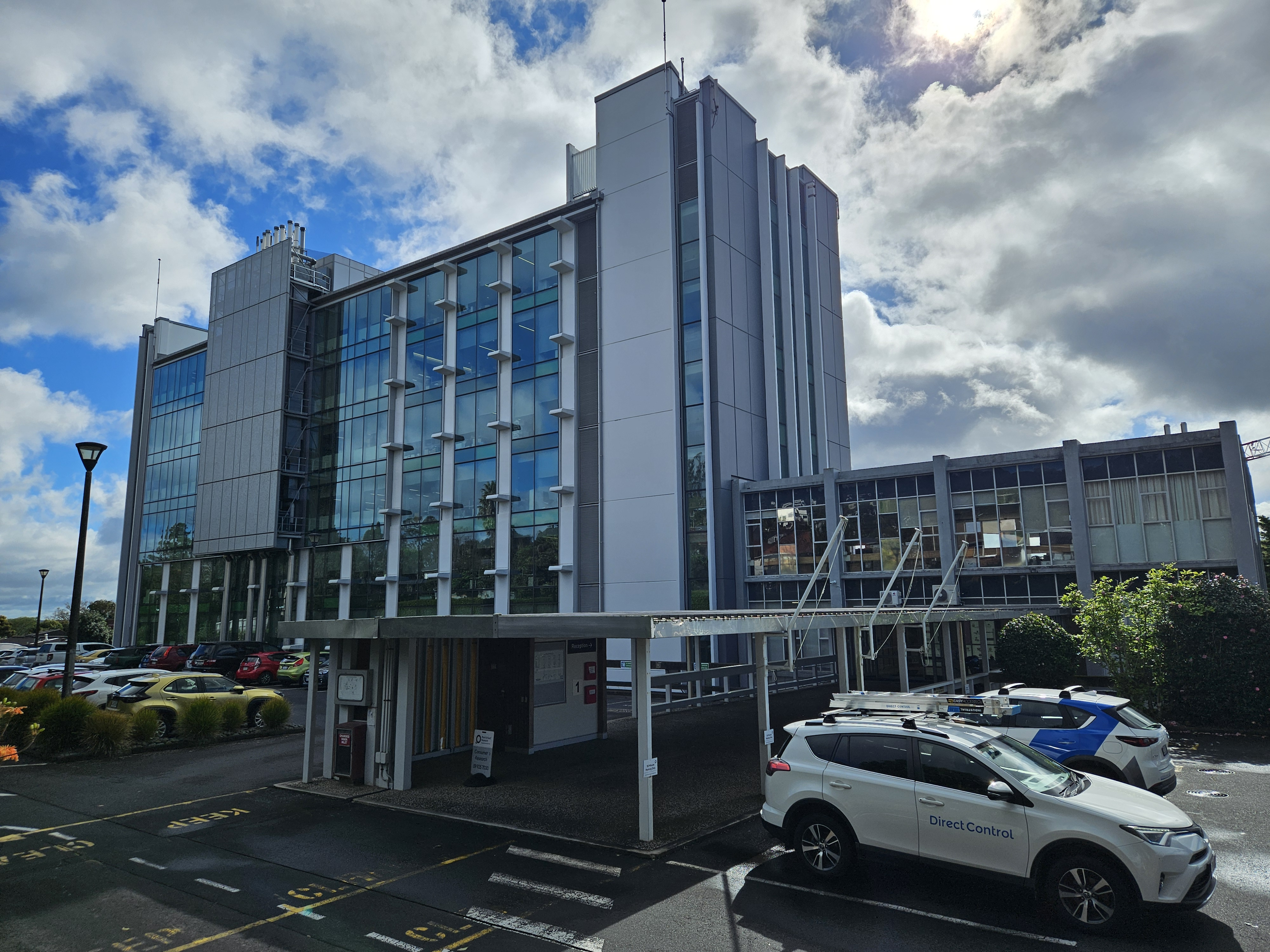
- Mt Albert Research Centre in Auckland, New Zealand

Agency overview
- Formed: 2008
- Preceding agency: HortResearch and Crop and Food Research
- Dissolved: 30 June 2025
- Superseding agency: New Zealand Institute for Bioeconomy Science
- Headquarters: 120 Mt Albert Road, Sandringham, Auckland
- Agency executives: Mark Piper, CEO; Nicola Shadbolt, Chair
- Website: plantandfood.co.nz

Plant & Food Research (Māori: Rangahau Ahumāra Kai) was a New Zealand Crown Research Institute (CRI) that is now part of the New Zealand Institute for Bioeconomy Science. Its purpose was to enhance the value and productivity of New Zealand's horticultural, arable, seafood and food and beverage industries. The interests of the institute were based in horticulture, arable and seafood research, specifically in the areas of sustainable production, bioprotection, elite genetics and intelligent breeding, food and health science and biomaterials; these have moved into the New Zealand Institute for Bioeconomy Science.

The institute was formed on 1 December 2008 by merging existing CRIs HortResearch and Crop and Food Research. Plant & Food has over 900 staff based at sites throughout New Zealand as well as science and business development staff working in the United States, Europe, Asia and Australia. The New Zealand Government disestablished the institute and its sister CRIs AgResearch, Scion, and Manaaki Whenua to create the New Zealand Institute for Bioeconomy Science on 1 July 2025.

== History ==
On 1 October 2021, Plant & Food Research commenced an even joint venture with Zespri: the Kiwifruit Breeding Centre. The research and development centre, based in Te Puke and also operating out of Kerikeri, Motueka and Mt Albert, is focused on improving kiwifruit breeding and cultivation. The initial aims are to develop kiwifruit varieties that are healthier, better tasting, and more sustainable for the environment. Matt Glenn is the inaugural CEO of the centre.

On 14 May 2025, Minister of Science, Innovation and Technology Shane Reti announced that Plant & Food Research would be integrated into a new Public Research Organisation called the New Zealand Institute for Bioeconomy Science from 1 July.

== Notable staff ==
- Trish Fraser, soil scientist
- Jasna Rakonjac, microbiologist
- Ian Warrington, horticultural scientist and science administrator
- Maren Wellenreuther, marine scientist
