= 1998 tourist kidnappings in Yemen =

Seventeen tourists from western countries

- Location: Abyan Governorate, Yemen
- Date: 28 December 1998
- Target: Western tourists
- Attack type: Mass kidnapping; shootout; ambush
- Weapons: AK-47 assault rifles, bazookas
- Victims: 16
- Perpetrator: Aden-Abyan Islamic Army
- Assailant: Al-Fadl tribesmen
- No. of participants: 18
- Defender: Yemeni police
- Motive: Demand the release of imprisoned militants in Yemen; Retaliation to the 1998 bombing of Iraq
- Convictions: Al-Mihdar: Kidnapping (16 counts); Abu Hamza: Terrorism
- Sentence: Al-Mihdar: Capital punishment Abu Hamza: Life imprisonment
- Convicted: Zein Al-Abidine al-Mihdar, Abu Hamza al-Masri

On 28 December 1998, a group of seventeen tourists from western countries, mostly the United Kingdom, was attacked by the Aden-Abyan Islamic Army in Abyan Governorate while traveling to Aden, Yemen. Sixteen tourists were abducted and taken to a remote hideout. The following day, Yemeni forces raided the hideout in an attempt to rescue the hostages, resulting in the release of twelve of them and the death of four.

== Background ==
Kidnappings of foreigners in Yemen were not uncommon and were mainly conducted by tribes who sought to pressure the Yemeni government into providing them aid or improving their living conditions. From 1992 to 1998, over 100 people were abducted in the country. The issue caused President Ali Abdullah Saleh to impose capital punishment for kidnappings in August 1998. However, tribal kidnappings were fairly rare in southern Yemen, and the 1998 kidnapping took place in Abyan Governorate where militant groups aligned with Osama bin Laden operated. Until the 1998 kidnapping, captives were released unharmed and deaths in the process were rare.

== Kidnapping ==
On 28 December 1998, a convoy of five vehicles was carrying tourists on holiday along the main road from Habban to Aden. The trip was organised by the travel company Explore Worldwide, based in Aldershot, and Yahya Al-Haifi, a local. The convoy, escorted by Yemeni police, held seventeen tourists – thirteen Britons, two Americans, and two Australians – who were interested in learning about Arabic society and culture. Soon after the tourists finished their lunch, the convoy was stopped by gunmen in the desert. Eighteen Aden-Abyan Islamic Army members from the Al-Fadl tribe armed with Kalashnikovs and bazookas opened fire at the police escorts. No injuries were reported in the ensuing shootout. The lead vehicle, which held a British tourist and a Yemeni tour guide, was able to escape and reach Mawdiyah, Abyan, where it alerted authorities of the kidnapping.

The remaining sixteen tourists were abducted and taken to a mountainous hideout in al-Wade'a, 400 kilometres (250 mi) south of the capital, Sanaa. An English-speaking militant told the group the reason they were captured, which was to secure the release of six men linked to Abu Hamza al-Masri, including two of his relatives, who were imprisoned for planning terrorist attacks against several targets, including the British consulate, a church, and a hotel. There were also reports that the militants demanded the release of their leader, Saleh Haidara al-Atwi, while also stating "It's not your fault that your countries bombed Iraq," referring to the 1998 bombing of Iraq. The number of captives taken in the kidnapping made it one of the largest in Yemen's history, and it was reportedly the first by Islamic militants.

Among the captives were Laurence and Margaret Whitehouse; a British couple of 26 years, Peter Rowe; a Canadian-born Briton, Erik Firkins; a British professor, Ruth Williamson; also a Briton, Andrew Thirsk and Catherine Spence; respectively an accountant and a computer expert from Sydney, and Mary Quin; an American–New Zealand dual national. A second group of tourists organised by Caravan Tours was able to evade capture since it stopped for vegetables at a nearby market. Nick Green, a tour guide from London, recounted waving at the group as it overtook his before it drove into a roadblock set up by the kidnappers. The abductions brought the total number of Westerners held hostage in Yemen at the time to 20, joining four German tourists kidnapped by the Bani Dhabyan tribe in Marib Governorate.

== Rescue attempt ==
Before the rescue operation, some hostages said that their kidnappers acted friendly towards them. There were initially hopes that the hostage crisis would end peacefully, similarly to other such incidents, and Yemeni authorities attempted to negotiate their release earlier in the day. British ambassador Vincent Henderson urged Yemen to not conduct a rescue operation.

On the morning of 29 December 1998, as the captives joked about whether or not their captors would provide them breakfast, a team of over 200 heavily armed Yemeni soldiers surrounded the hideout. As soldiers approached, the militants divided the hostages into two groups of eleven and five and took them to separate locations before using the women in human shields to fend off security forces. Soon after, a two-hour shootout began between the soldiers and militants, though it is unknown who fired first. According to Yemen, the militants killed two hostages, prompting Yemeni forces to storm the hideout to prevent the killing of further hostages. Their account is disputed by the hostages, who said that the soldiers began to fire indiscriminately at the militants. According to Laurence, the militants began to retreat. The militants used Thirsk as a human shield, and he was shot and wounded soon after. Margaret attempted to tend to his wounds but more shots broke out, and Margaret and Thirsk were struck. Margaret was killed instantly and Thirsk was on the verge of death, later succumbing to his wounds. Soldiers on the scene allowed Laurence to kill his wife's murderer, but he did not understand the offer, and had been loading his wife's body into a car to be taken to a hospital at the time.

At the peak of the fighting, Spence was taken by a militant who pointed a semi-automatic firearm at her back and forced her to advance. Spence then pushed him away and fell to the ground to avoid further gunfire. One of the militants fired two shots within a foot of her on either side of her. Firkins stated that a gunman pointed a gun at his chest but went away, and a female hostage – Williamson – was subsequently fatally shot on the back of her neck. Meanwhile, Rowe was also shot and later succumbed to his wounds at a hospital. When the shooting ceased, Spence got up and was the first to help the wounded, and the survivors were rescued by the soldiers.

In total, three Britons and one Australian were killed, two of whom were women and the other two were men. Two others – an American and a Briton – were critically injured and treated at a hospital in Aden, neither of whom were in life-threatening condition. Ten tourists – eight Britons, one American, and one Australian – escaped uninjured. During the shootout, Yemeni forces killed two kidnappers, injured three, and arrested four.

== Aftermath ==
Previous kidnappings, despite threatening Yemen's tourism industry, did not have much of an effect on it. However, due to the fatalities seen in the botched rescue attempt, tourism in the country saw a severe decrease, with the year following seeing only 50,000 tourists enter, as opposed to 105,000 in 1998. The British Foreign Office also advised British nationals in Yemen to leave the country as soon as possible and to remain vigilant and not travel outside of the main towns.

== Trials ==
=== Zein Al-Abidine al-Mihdar ===
Zein Al-Abidine al-Mihdar, also known as Abu Hassan, was the leader of the Aden-Abyan Islamic Army. In January 1999, he admitted to kidnapping the tourists and using them as human shields during a court hearing. During the hearing, he boasted about his actions, saying that he "abducted the infidels because their governments attacked Muslims indiscriminately," and proclaiming "I am innocent. I am just a holy warrior in the name of God."

In May, to the disdain of a British hostage who wanted al-Mihdar to be spared of the death penalty, he was sentenced to death. Following the sentence, the Aden-Abyan Islamic Army threatened to kill foreign ambassadors, doctors, and tourists in Yemen unless al-Mihdar was freed. Their threats were ignored, and in October, Yemen's highest court rejected an appeal by al-Mihdar. On 16 October, he was executed by firing squad in Sanaa, making it the first execution since August 1998.

=== Abu Hamza al-Masri ===
Mustafa Kamel Mustafa, better known as Abu Hamza al-Masri or simply Abu Hamza, is an Islamic cleric and imam. At the time of the kidnapping, he resided in London and gained a negative reputation over hateful comments he made at the Finsbury Park mosque. In 2014, at a courthouse in Lower Manhattan, he was accused of playing a role in three terrorist incidents and plots, including the 1998 kidnapping. He denied playing a role in the kidnapping. However, just two years after the kidnapping, survivor Mary Quin conducted an interview with Abu Hamza, in which he referred to the abductions saying, "We didn't know it would be that bad," and called it "Islamically justified". A Nera Ltd. employee who sold a pre-paid phone to Abu Hamza in the 1990s said that on the day of the kidnapping, Abu Hamza bought 500 British pounds worth of minutes for his phone.

Abu Hamza admitted to providing the militants a satellite phone which they had used in the attack, but said that he provided it to them months before the kidnapping. He also admitted to contacting their leader three hours after the abductions. His lawyers urged leniency due to his missing hands, which he had lost from an accident in Pakistan in 1993. Abu Hamza plead not guilty to all of the charges – eleven counts of terrorism and kidnapping. On 9 January 2015, he was found guilty of terrorism charges and sentenced to life in prison.

== See also ==
- 1995 kidnapping of western tourists in Kashmir
- 2008 Maimbung kidnappings
- 2014 hostage rescue operations in Yemen
