= Callaghan Innovation =

New Zealand research institute

Coordinates: 41°14′1.16″S 174°55′7.21″E

Crown entity overview
- Formed: 1 February 2013
- Preceding Crown entity: Industrial Research Limited
- Dissolved: 2025
- Jurisdiction: Government of New Zealand
- Headquarters: Gracefield, Lower Hutt, New Zealand
- Motto: New Zealand's Innovation Agency
- Minister responsible: Shane Reti, Minister of Science, Innovation and Technology
- Crown entity executives: Stefan Korn, Chief Executive; Elena Trout, Chair
- Key document: Callaghan Innovation Act 2012
- Website: www.callaghaninnovation.govt.nz

Callaghan Innovation was a New Zealand Crown entity responsible for making New Zealand business more innovative.

== History ==
It was established on 1 February 2013, after the House of Representatives passed the Callaghan Innovation Bill the previous year. Industrial Research Limited, a Crown Research Institute, was merged into it. The institute takes its name from Sir Paul Callaghan, a prominent New Zealand physicist who died in 2012.

Mary Quin became the first chief executive, in May 2013, and resigned in July 2016. Victoria Crone started as chief executive on 28 February 2017 and resigned in July 2021. Stefan Korn became the acting executive and was permanently appointed in September 2022.

On 6 January 2014 the departments of carbohydrate chemistry and high temperature superconductors were ceded to Victoria University of Wellington, being renamed the Ferrier and Robinson Research Institutes respectively. This resulted in a transfer of 55 staff.

=== Dissolution ===
Prime Minister Christopher Luxon and Minister of Science, Innovation and Technology Judith Collins announced the government's intention to close Callaghan Innovation in a "state of the nation" speech on 23 January 2025. Collins justified the closure on the grounds that the crown research institute had "been spread too thinly across too many functions, leading to poor financial performance and an over-reliance on Crown funding." Its functions would be transferred to other entities.

In mid February 2025, the Public Service Association reported that Callaghan Innovation was proposing slashing 63 jobs in response to Government plans to disestablish the organisation. This included 16 commercialisation roles, 14 scientists and engineers and six Māori innovation roles.

On 14 February, Callaghan Innovation released a statement announcing functions and services that would be transferred to the Ministry of Business, Innovation and Employment (MBIE) and the Public Research Organisations (PROs). Callaghan Innovation's funding and grant services and the Health Tech Activator would be transferred to MBIE, the Biotechnologies Group to the proposed New Zealand Institute for Bioeconomy Science (NZIBS) and the Measurement Standards Laboratory (MSL) to the proposed New Zealand Institute for Earth Science (NZIES). In addition, the Bioresource Processing Alliance (BPA), Food Innovation Network (FIN) and New Zealand Product Accelerator (NZPA) would be transferred to the relevant public research organisations following consultation between MBIE and the Crown Research Institutes.

== Notable staff ==
- Juliet Gerrard – biochemist
- Peter Beck – founder of Rocket Lab
