= TuiaNet =

TuiaNet or Tuia was a national research and education network (NERN) in New Zealand. Established in 1992, it provided the first Internet backbone for the country. This backbone provided a 48 kbit/s connection between every New Zealand university, many Crown Research Institute and the National Library. It also provided an international connection of 128 kbit/s (1992) to 512 kbit/s (1994) to the Ames Research Center. By 1993, the parties involved in the network rarely engaged in further collaboration on the network, and private internet service providers soon emerged.

The main international connection of the network was replaced with the Southern Cross Cable, and a new NERN emerged through the Kiwi Advanced Research and Education Network (KAREN) in 2006.

== See also ==
- Kiwi Advanced Research and Education Network
