= Carbon neutral (disambiguation) =

Carbon neutrality is a balancing greenhouse gas emissions with renewable energy.

Carbon neutral might also refer to:

- Zero-carbon building, carbon neutral buildings
- Carbon neutral fuel or carbon negative fuel

== Carbon offsetting ==
- Carbon offsetting to reduce carbon dioxide gas emissions
- The carboNZero programme, a measurement, reduction and offset programme administered by Landcare Research
