= Ian Warrington =

New Zealand scientist

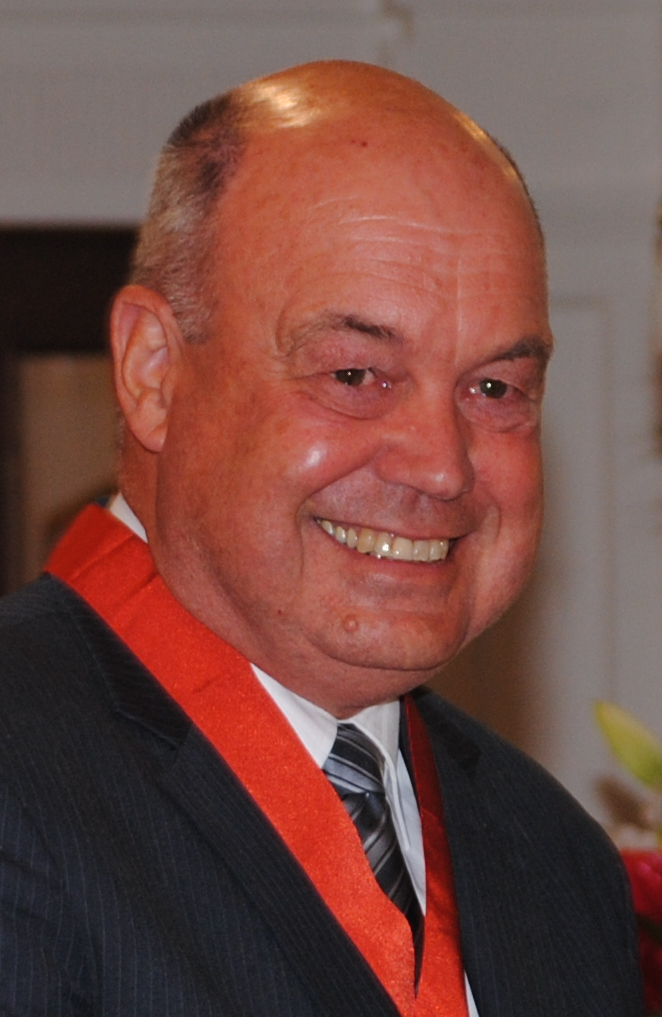
Warrington in 2011

Ian James Warrington CNZM is a New Zealand horticultural scientist and science administrator. He is a former chief executive of HortResearch (now Plant & Food Research). He was a senior administrator at Massey University until his position was axed in a cost-saving move.

Warrington earned a master's degree at Massey University in 1974 with a thesis on artificial light spectra and plant growth.

Warrington received the T. K. Sidey Medal in 1984, an award set up by the Royal Society of New Zealand for outstanding scientific research. In the 2011 New Year Honours, Warrington was appointed a Companion of the New Zealand Order of Merit, for services to science.
