= Prue Williams =

Soil scientist and science manager at MBIE in New Zealand

Prue Williams CRSNZ
- Awards: Companion of the Royal Society of New Zealand

Academic background
- Education: Massey University
- Thesis: The fate of potassium in grazed dairy pastures (1988)
- Doctoral advisor: Paul Gregg, Mike Hedley

Prudence Helen Williams CRSNZ is a New Zealand soil scientist, and public servant. She is a senior manager in the Ministry of Business, Innovation and Employment, and serves on the board of the Global Research Council. She was awarded a Public Service Medal, and was elected a Companion of the Royal Society Te Apārangi in 2023.

== Academic career ==
Williams completed a PhD titled The fate of potassium in grazed dairy pastures at Massey University. Williams then joined the staff of the New Zealand Institute for Crop and Food Research. Williams moved into science management in 2003, joining the Foundation for Research, Science and Technology in 2008.

Williams is the General Manager Science System Investment and Performance at the Ministry of Business, Innovation and Employment (MBIE). Williams is the senior public servant in charge of Te Ara Paerangi Future Pathways, which will reform the New Zealand science system.

Williams represented New Zealand on the Global Research Council, and then was elected to the Board in 2019. She serves on the advisory board of the Antarctic Research Centre.

== Honours and awards ==
In 2021 Williams was awarded a Public Service Medal, an award conferred by the Public Service Commission to recognise "public servants who exemplify the spirit of service and are making a real difference through their everyday work for New Zealand or New Zealanders". The citation noted her advocacy for research, and care and empathy for colleagues.

In 2023 Williams was elected a Companion of the Royal Society Te Apārangi, for "her outstanding contribution to Aotearoa’s research, science, and innovation sector".

== Selected works ==
- R.J. Haynes; P.H. Williams (1993). "Nutrient Cycling and Soil Fertility in the Grazed Pasture Ecosystem". Advances in Agronomy. pp. 119–199. doi:10.1016/s0065-2113(08)60794-4. ISSN 0065-2113. Wikidata Q130753678.
- P. H. Williams; Haynes, Richard (1994). "Comparison of initial wetting pattern, nutrient concentrations in soil solution and the fate of15N-labelled urine in sheep and cattle urine patch areas of pasture soil". Plant and Soil. 162 (1): 49–59. doi:10.1007/bf01416089. Wikidata Q130753671.
- Fraser, Patricia M.; Haynes, Richard; P. H. Williams (1994). "Effects of pasture improvement and intensive cultivation on microbial biomass, enzyme activities, and composition and size of earthworm populations". Biology and Fertility of Soils. 17 (3): 185–190. doi:10.1007/bf00336320. Wikidata Q111085126.
- Fraser, Patricia M.; P.H. Williams; Haynes, Richard (1996). "Earthworm species, population size and biomass under different cropping systems across the Canterbury Plains, New Zealand". Applied Soil Ecology. 3 (1): 49–57. doi:10.1016/0929-1393(95)00062-3. Wikidata Q111085124.
- P.H. Williams; S.C. Jarvis; E. Dixon (1998). "Emission of nitric oxide and nitrous oxide from soil under field and laboratory conditions". Soil Biology and Biochemistry. 30 (14): 1885–1893. doi:10.1016/s0038-0717(98)00052-2. Wikidata Q130753660.
- Haynes, Richard; P. H. Williams (1999). "Influence of stock camping behaviour on the soil microbiological and biochemical properties of grazed pastoral soils". Biology and Fertility of Soils. 28 (3): 253–258. doi:10.1007/s003740050490. Wikidata Q130753640.
