= Sundli =

Sundli is a surname. Notable people with the surname include:

- Gunnhild Sundli (born 1985), Norwegian musical artist
- Mari Sundli Tveit, Norwegian research executive
- Morten Sundli (born 1990), Norwegian footballer
