= Realestate.co.nz =

New Zealand property listings website

realestate.co.nz
- Type: NZ Limited Company
- Founded: 1996
- Founder: Leonie Freeman
- Headquarters: Auckland, New Zealand
- Area served: New Zealand
- Key people: Sarah Wood (CEO)
- Owner: Real Estate Institute of New Zealand (50%) and Property Page NZ Limited (50%)
- Website: www.realestate.co.nz

realestate.co.nz is a New Zealand property listings website. It includes residential and commercial property for sale and rent/lease as well as business for sale listings. The platform is owned by the Real Estate Institute of New Zealand (REINZ) and Property Page Limited which is made up of New Zealand real estate agencies. The platform also publishes property market data.

== History ==
The platform was launched in 1996 by Leonie Freeman under the name RealENZ.co.nz as a joint venture between REINZ and the Auckland Multiple Listed Bureau.

The site rebranded to realestate.co.nz in 2005 when Property Page Limited (made up of New Zealand real estate agencies) joined the shareholding. In 2023 the company integrated artificial intelligence (AI) to automate manual listing processes and surface floor plans within listings. In 2024, they let private landlords list rentals on the site for the first time.

== Property market data ==
Academic research by Victoria University of Wellington professor Aeron Davis identified realestate.co.nz as one of the sources most frequently cited in New Zealand property news coverage, alongside organisations such as Quotable Value, CoreLogic and the Real Estate Institute of New Zealand. Realestate.co.nz’s dataset, including average asking prices, stock and new listings, dates back to 2007 and is referenced by national, regional and industry media reporting on the property market. Chief Executive Sarah Wood and spokesperson Vanessa Williams provide market commentary.

== Ownership ==
realestate.co.nz is half owned by the Real Estate Institute of New Zealand (REINZ) and the other half by Property Page NZ Limited made up of New Zealand real estate agencies Harcourts, Ray White, LJ Hooker, Bayleys, and Barfoot & Thompson. Sarah Wood has been CEO of the company since February 2019.
