= Aden-Abyan Islamic Army =

Islamist militant group in Yemen

- جيش عدن أبين الإسلامي
- Leaders: Abu Hasan Zayn al-Abadin al-Mihdhar (1996–1998) †; Khalid Abd al-Nabi (1998–2009)
- Dates active: 1996–2009
- Headquarters: Abyan, Yemen
- Active regions: Southern Yemen
- Ideology: Salafist jihadism Islamic fundamentalism
- Size: 100
- Wars: Al-Qaeda insurgency in Yemen

The Aden-Abyan Islamic Army (AAIA, Arabic: جيش عدن أبين الإسلامي, romanized: Jaysh ʻAdan Abayyan al-Islāmī) was a Sunni Islamist militant group based in southern Yemen founded by Abu Hasan Zayn al-Abadin al-Mihdhar. The groups goals were to overthrow the Yemeni government and establish an Islamic state, as well as support the jihad of al-Qaeda. AAIA was designated a terrorist organization by Bahrain, Canada and the United Kingdom. AAIA is thought to have organized in southern Yemen in the mid 1990s, with members that include veterans from the Soviet war in Afghanistan. Their stated mission is to "promote jihad in the fight against secularism in Yemen and other Arab States; to establish an Islamic government in Yemen". By 2009, the group's remaining members had subsumed in the newly formed al-Qaeda in the Arabian Peninsula.

== History ==
During the Soviet-Afghan War, thousands of Yemenis joined the Afghan mujahideen and took part in jihad against the Soviet Union before returning to Yemen after their withdrawal. Among these returning veterans in the early 1990's included commander Abu Hasan Zayn al-Abadin al-Mihdhar, a native of Shabwah governorate who managed to recruit various fighters under his command in Afghanistan. These fighters would be utilized and directly supported by the Yemeni government and military commander Ali Mohsen al-Ahmar to fight the southern secessionist Yemeni Socialist Party during the Yemeni civil war of 1994. President Ali Abdullah Saleh had promised the fighters that once the war was over the government would implement sharia law, though this promise was never fulfilled. After the war, al-Mihdhar and his fighters officially formed the AAIA in 1996 or 1997 in order to fulfil the establishment of an Islamic state.

The group's first activities were conducted in May 1998 and June 1998 when it started releasing various declarations criticizing the policies of the Yemeni government. In December 1998, AAIA militants kidnapped a group of 16 Western tourists in Abyan governorate, demanding the Yemeni government release two recently arrested Islamist clerics operating in southern Yemen. The Yemeni military launched a rescue operation the subsequent day, raiding an AAIA hideout in a battle which killed four of the tourists and several militants, as well as the capture of al-Mihdhar, who was executed a year later. The Yemeni government publicly stated that the AAIA was dismantled after the attack, though most independent sources maintain that the group remained active, albeit significantly weakened.

In January 2000, the AAIA directly collaborated with al-Qaeda in an attempt to bomb the USS The Sullivans by loading a boat with remote controlled explosives, though the attack was a failure as the boat sank. In October 2000, two al-Qaeda skiff drivers, using the explosives from the failed attempt, bombed the USS Cole off the harbor of Aden, killing 17 U.S. sailors. Though the AAIA, along with multiple other organizations, claimed responsibility for the attack, American and Yemeni officials determined that the attack was conducted directly by al-Qaeda affiliates in the country. In November 2002, a CIA drone strike in Marib governorate killed AQY leader Qaed Salim Sinan al-Harethi along with four AAIA members travelling together in a car.

On 22 June 2003, AAIA militants attacked an army medical convoy providing humanitarian work near the mountainous Jabal Hatat region in Abyan, wounding seven. In response, on 25 June 2003 Yemeni forces launched a major offensive against AAIA strongholds in Jabal Hatat. At that point, nearly 80 AAIA members were reportedly besieged in the mountains. The offensive lead to the arrest of 11 AAIA members and the deaths of six, including AAIA leader Khalid Abd al-Nabi, though authorities later stated that they had mistaken another militant for al-Nabi. In September 2003, the Yemeni government announced that they would grant amnesty to al-Qaeda linked militants so long as they renounced their extremist views and refrain from violence. In October 2003, al-Nabi was turned himself in and was released by authorities after renouncing violence. In November 2003, the government pardoned and released 93 militants, including 54 AAIA members from Jabal Hatat who had surrendered since the amnesty was announced.
