= Invermay Agricultural Centre =

Scientific research centre in New Zealand

Coordinates: 45°51.5′S 170°23.4′E

Invermay Agricultural Centre is located close to Mosgiel, on the Taieri Plains in Otago, New Zealand. Part of AgResearch, it is a scientific research centre specialising in research into genomics, animal reproduction, land management and biosecurity.

Its location may be viewed on the map using the following link: Ag Research Invermay
