= Animal Control Products =

Animal Control Products Limited
- Company type: State owned enterprise
- Founded: 1991
- Headquarters: Whanganui New Zealand
- Key people: Terry Murdoch (Chair); William McCook (CEO)
- Products: pest control products
- Website: www.pestoff.co.nz

Animal Control Products Limited is a state-owned enterprise of the New Zealand government. Its main business is the manufacture and sale of pest management products.

== History ==
The business originally started in the 1950s by the (then) Ministry of Agriculture and the New Zealand Forest Service. It imported, processed and distributed toxins used to control a range of pests including rabbits, wallabies, possums and rooks. In 1991, the company was established as a Crown-owned company under its own legislation and became a state-owned enterprise in 2005.

It operates under the State–Owned Enterprises Act 1986.

== Operations ==
Animal Control Products operates one manufacturing plant in Whanganui in the lower North Island. In addition to direct sales to government agencies such as the Department of Conservation, to professional pest control operators and to regional councils, it also sells its products in over 150 outlets throughout New Zealand.
