= AsureQuality =

New Zealand state-owned enterprise

AsureQuality Limited
- Native name: Kaitiaki Kai
- Type: State-owned enterprise
- Industry: Food Quality Assurance
- Predecessor: ASURE New Zealand Limited; AgriQuality Limited
- Founded: Auckland, New Zealand (2007)
- Headquarters: Auckland, New Zealand
- Number of locations: 100
- Area served: New Zealand; Australia; Malaysia; Singapore; Indonesia; Thailand
- Services: Food Assurance; Laboratory Testing; Animal Welfare; Apiculture
- Owner: New Zealand Government
- Number of employees: 1800
- Website: www.asurequality.com

AsureQuality Limited (previously AgriQuality Limited) is a State-Owned Enterprise (SOE) fully owned by the government of New Zealand. The company's core business is food quality assurance with its services including certification, inspection, testing, and training. AsureQuality has over 1700 staff at over 100 locations throughout New Zealand. AsureQuality also has a joint venture partner, Bureau Veritas.. Bureau Veritas and AsureQuality have two joint ventures, BVAQ Australia and BVAQ SouthEast Asia.

== Company history ==
AsureQuality was formed in 2007 from the merger of ASURE New Zealand Limited and AgriQuality Limited. Both companies were originally formed in 1998 from the service delivery arm of the Ministry of Agriculture and Forestry Quality Management, with ASURE handling meat inspection and AgriQuality specialising in livestock, horticulture and forestry. Following the merger the company employed more than 1700 staff at 140 sites throughout New Zealand and Australia, with its primary laboratory in Gracefield, New Zealand.

In 2008 AsureQuality entered a partnership with the Hospitality Standards Institute to provide food safety training for the hospitality sector. In 2010 it opened a wine-certification laboratory in Auckland; in 2013 it expanded its Christchurch food-testing laboratory.

In May 2010 it was among a group of SOEs valued for possible sale by the New Zealand government.

In April 2016 the company acquired Australian laboratory-testing provider Dairy Technical Services.

In November 2020 the company was fined $66,000 after pleading guilty to two breaches of the Health and Safety at Work Act over an incident in which seven workers suffered chemical burns while cleaning a Mycoplasma bovis-infected farm in 2018.

== Services ==
Audit, inspection, testing, verification and certification

- Independent audit, inspection, verification and certification against local and international regulatory and retailer standards
- Veterinary and field technician services including farm assurance, dairy farm assessment, sample collection, TB testing and related disease management
- Ante-mortem and post-mortem meat inspection

Food and contaminants testing

- Food testing and analysis against regulatory and retailer standards for pathogens, toxins, allergens, chemical residues, genetically modified organisms and nutritional information
- Seed testing and certification for arable, dairy, and livestock farming and export
- Specialist plant and pest taxonomy, border control and pathology services

Diagnostics

- Contract manufacturing of diagnostic products and distribution of specialist veterinary test kits for use in disease management programmes

Market Assurance

Services include the following:

- New Zealand Grass-Fed Certification: offers a standardised framework to define and certify New Zealand grass-fed products.
- Verified Attributes: offers customised programmes to verify unique product claims. The verified claims can be integrated into the AQ Assured Transparency Programme, enabling brands to provide customers with end-to-end supply chain information through a QR code for a premium product experience.
- Brand Endorsement Co-marketing: brand endorsement videos, live streaming, joint media releases, and storytelling through Market Assurance's social media channels.

Training

- NZQA-approved training courses are offered mainly to help Quality Control Managers, Internal Auditors, Food Producers, Technical Compliance Coordinators and other food industry professionals to improve their confidence and competence in their field of work
- Courses on Food Safety, HPCCA and Auditing

Biosecurity

- Under agreement with the Ministry for Primary Industries, AsureQuality provides readiness, capability, incursion response and surveillance services for biosecurity
