= Mary Quin =

- Born: U.S.
- Education: Harvard University (MBA); Northwestern University (PhD)
- Occupation: Former chief executive at Callaghan Innovation
- Known for: being kidnapped and being held hostage

Mary Quin is a business chief executive. She is the former chief executive at Callaghan Innovation, was an executive at Xerox in New York City, and a dual citizen of the United States and New Zealand.

She was raised in Palmerston North, New Zealand and received her secondary education at St Peter's College. In 1998, while traveling in Yemen her tourist group was kidnapped and four tourists were killed. After surviving being a hostage, she provided the FBI with information that allowed British cleric, Abu Hamza, to be extradited to the United States for his role in the kidnapping. She wrote a book about that affair: Kidnapped in Yemen: One Woman's Amazing Escape from Captivity (The Lyons Press, ISBN 978-1592287284).

The New Zealand Herald named her as one of two 2014 New Zealanders of the Year.

== See also ==
- List of kidnappings
- List of solved missing person cases
