= Jasna Rakonjac =

Serbian microbiologist in New Zealand

- Education: The Rockefeller University
- Awards: New Zealand Microbiological Society Distinguished Orator Award
- Scientific career
- Fields: Microbiology; biotechnology
- Workplaces: Plant & Food Research, Massey University, The Rockefeller University

Jasna Rakonjac is a New Zealand microbiologist, and is a full professor at Massey University, specialising in the biology and structure of bacteriophages, and the development of technology for use in veterinary, medical, and agriculture fields. Rakonjac has founded two biotechnology spin-out companies.

== Academic career ==
Rakonjac was born in Serbia, and travelled to the US for a Fulbright Fellowship in New York. Rakonjac completed Bachelor of Science and Master of Science degrees in molecular biology and biochemistry at the University of Belgrade, and then a PhD in biomedical sciences at the Rockefeller University. After postdoctoral research at Rockefeller, Rakonjac joined Plant & Food Research in New Zealand in 1990. Rakonjac joined the faculty of Massey University in 2003, rising to full professor in 2023.

== Research ==
Rakonjac specialises in the biology and structure of bacteriophages, and the development of technology for use in veterinary, medical, and agriculture fields. In 2003, she was awarded a Marsden grant to study bacteriophage technology, and in 2010 she was an associate investigator on a Fast Start Marsden grant led by Massey researcher Dragana Gagic, titled Stuck on you: exploring the role of adhesins in microbial symbioses. Rakonjac invented a new technology for the production of nanorods from bacteriophages, and is the recipient of several MBIE-funded grants to explore antibiotic resistance, develop diagnostic tests for COVID-19 and develop the nanorods production system. Rakonjac has founded two companies, Nanophage Technologies and Retrabac Therapeutics. Retrabac Therapeutics is developing topical antibiotic treatments for drug-resistant bacteria, while Nanophage Technologies, a collaboration with BridgeWest Ventures, is developing technology for diagnostic tests and delivery of vaccines.

Rakonjac led the redesign of the microbiology degree at Massey.

== Honours and awards ==
In 2019, Rakonjac was awarded the New Zealand Microbiology Society's Distinguished Orator Award.

== Selected works ==
- Jasna Rakonjac; Nicholas J. Bennett; Julian Spagnuolo; Dragana Gagic; Marjorie Russel (2011). "Filamentous bacteriophage: biology, phage display and nanotechnology applications". Current Issues in Molecular Biology. 13 (2): 51–76. doi:10.21775/cimb.013.051. PMID 21502666. Wikidata Q33876273.
- R Casellas; T A Shih; Markus Kleinewietfeld; Jasna Rakonjac; David Nemazee; Klaus Rajewsky; M C Nussenzweig (2001). "Contribution of receptor editing to the antibody repertoire". Science. 291 (5508): 1541–1544. doi:10.1126/science.1056600. PMID 11222858. Wikidata Q57198265.
- SARA A SCOTT; JOHN D BROOKS; JASNA RAKONJAC; KYLIE M R WALKER; STEVE H FLINT (2007). "The formation of thermophilic spores during the manufacture of whole milk powder". International Journal of Dairy Technology. 60 (2): 109–117. doi:10.1111/j.1471-0307.2007.00309.x. Wikidata Q125184635.
- J V Rakonjac; J C Robbins; V A Fischetti (1995). "DNA sequence of the serum opacity factor of group A streptococci: identification of a fibronectin-binding repeat domain". Infection and Immunity. 63 (2): 622–631. doi:10.1128/iai.63.2.622-631.1995. PMC 173041. PMID 7822031. Wikidata Q36712396.
- Anne Mai-Prochnow; Janice Gee Kay Hui; Staffan Kjelleberg; Jasna Rakonjac; Diane McDougald; Scott A. Rice (2015). "'Big things in small packages: the genetics of filamentous phage and effects on fitness of their host'". FEMS Microbiology Reviews. 39 (4): 465–87. doi:10.1093/femsre/fuu007. PMID 25670735. Wikidata Q28086818.
- Jasna Rakonjac; Model P (1998). "Roles of pIII in filamentous phage assembly". Journal of Molecular Biology. 282 (1): 25–41. doi:10.1006/jmbi.1998.2006. PMID 9733639. Wikidata Q32023718.
- Rakonjac J; Feng J; Model P (1999). "Filamentous phage are released from the bacterial membrane by a two-step mechanism involving a short C-terminal fragment of pIII". Journal of Molecular Biology. 289 (5): 1253–1265. doi:10.1006/jmbi.1999.2851. PMID 10373366. Wikidata Q54091874.
- Rebecca Conners; Rayén Ignacia León-Quezada; Mathew McLaren; Nicholas J Bennett; Bertram Daum; Jasna Rakonjac; Vicki A M Gold (2023). "Cryo-electron microscopy of the f1 filamentous phage reveals insights into viral infection and assembly". Nature Communications. 14 (1): 2724. doi:10.1038/s41467-023-37915-w. PMC 10175506. PMID 37169795. Wikidata Q125184584.
