= REANNZ =

Research and Education Advanced Network New Zealand Ltd
- Abbreviation: REANNZ
- Formation: September 2005
- Legal status: Crown entity
- Headquarters: Wellington, New Zealand
- Region served: New Zealand
- Chairperson: Janine Smith
- Main organ: Board of Directors
- Website: reannz.co.nz
- ASN: 38022

The Research and Education Advanced Network New Zealand Ltd. (REANNZ), formerly known as the Kiwi Advanced Research and Education Network (KAREN), is a high-capacity, high-speed national research and education network (NREN) connecting New Zealand's tertiary institutions, research organisations, libraries, schools, museums, and the rest of the world. REANNZ is a Crown-owned non-profit company.

Commissioned in late 2006, REANNZ links to other established regional and national research and education networks, notably to JANET in the UK and to the Pacific Northwest Gigapop in Seattle.

== Topology ==
REANNZ consists of a high-speed optical network connecting points of presence (PoPs) throughout New Zealand. A PoP provides an interconnection point between member sites around the network. Members may connect at one or more POPs. REANNZ links universities and Crown Research Institutes within New Zealand via One NZ (Vodafone) fibre-optic cable and Vocus Communications, at speeds up to 100 gigabits per second.

International links to Sydney and to Seattle (Pacific Northwest Gigapop) via the Hawaiki Cable connect REANNZ to other national research and education networks in Australia and the United States, and through them to Asia and Europe for Research and Education traffic.

== High performance computing ==
On 1st July 2025, the New Zealand eScience Infrastructure (NeSI) was merged into REANNZ. Their staff, computing assets, and training portfolio have been integrated into REANNZ.

== See also ==
- TuiaNet

== Sources ==
- Claire Le Couteur. "Introducing KAREN". e.nz magazine Volume 8/4, July/August 2007
