= Bani Dhabyan =

Bani Dhabyan بني ضبيان
- Sub-district
- Location in Yemen
- Coordinates: 15.07651°N 44.87348°E
- Country: Yemen
- Governorate: Sana'a
- District: Bani Dhabyan

Population (2004)
  - Total: 16,209
- Time zone: UTC+3

Bani Dhabyan (Arabic: بني ضبيان) is a sub-district located in Bani Dhabyan District, Sana'a Governorate, Yemen. Bani Dhabyan had a population of 16,209 according to the 2004 census.
