= GNS Science =

New Zealand research institute

Coordinates: 41.195565°S 174.933175°E

- Te Pū Ao (Māori)

Agency overview
- Formed: 1865
- Preceding agencies: New Zealand Geological Survey (1865–1990); DSIR Geophysics Division (1951–1990); Institute of Nuclear Sciences (1959–1992); DSIR Geology and Geophysics (1990–1992); Institute of Geological and Nuclear Sciences (IGNS; 1992–2005)
- Dissolved: 30 June 2025
- Superseding agency: Earth Sciences New Zealand
- Headquarters: 1 Fairway Drive, Avalon, New Zealand
- Employees: 390
- Website: https://www.gns.cri.nz/

GNS Science (Māori: Te Pū Ao), officially registered as the Institute of Geological and Nuclear Sciences Limited, was a New Zealand Crown Research Institute. It focused on geology, geophysics (including seismology and volcanology), and nuclear science (particularly ion-beam technologies, isotope science and carbon dating). On 1 July 2025 GNS Science became part of the new Public Research Organisation Earth Sciences New Zealand.

== Functions and responsibilities ==
As well as undertaking basic research, and operating the national geological hazards monitoring network (GeoNet) and the National Isotope Centre (NIC), GNS Science contracted its services to various private groups (notably energy companies) both in New Zealand and overseas, as well as to central and local government agencies, to provide scientific advice and information.

GNS Science had its head office in Avalon, Lower Hutt, with other facilities in Gracefield, Dunedin, Wairakei, Auckland and Tokyo.

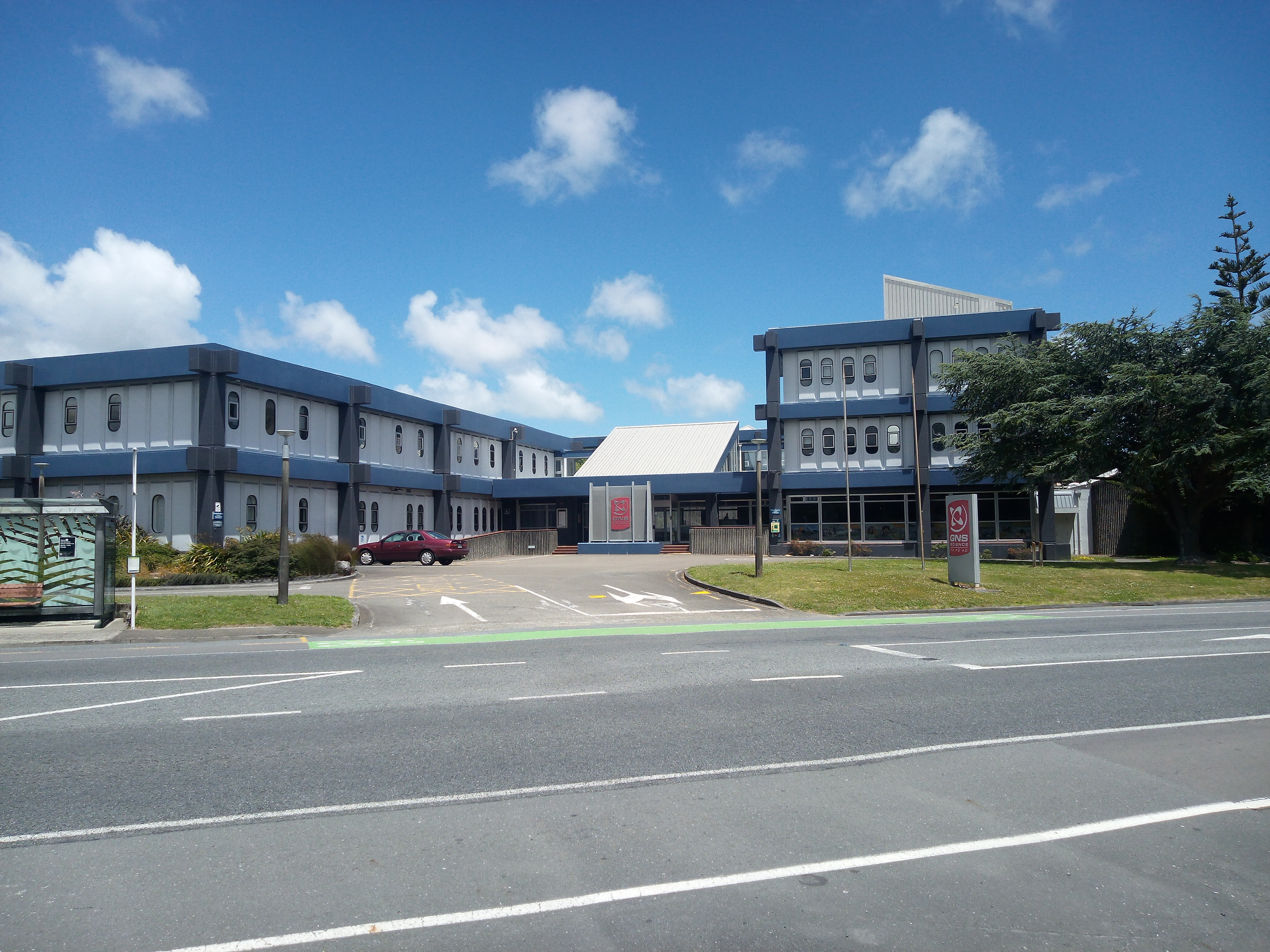
GNS Science headquarters in Avalon, Lower Hutt

== History ==
GNS Science was known as the Institute of Geological and Nuclear Sciences (IGNS) from 1992 to 2005. Originally part of the New Zealand Government's Department of Scientific and Industrial Research (DSIR), it was established as an independent organisation when the Crown Research Institutes were set up in 1992.

In late September 2024, GNS Science confirmed that 59 roles would be cut, amounting to ten percent of its workforce. In addition, 37 new roles would be created. This was part of the Sixth National Government's public sector job cuts.

In mid May 2025, Minister of Science, Innovation and Technology Shane Reti announced that GNS would be integrated into a new Public Research Organisation called Earth Sciences New Zealand from 1 July 2025.
