= Lincoln Primary School =

Lincoln Primary School/Te Kura o Tauhinu

Location
- 130 North Belt; Lincoln 7608; 43°38′13.92″S 172°29′13.20″E

Information
- Type: Primary (Year 0-8)
- Motto: "Lincoln Primary Students achieve personal excellence through being curious, caring and confident."
- Established: 1866
- Ministry of Education Institution no.: 3412
- Principal: Chris Nord
- Enrolment: 832
- Socio-economic decile: 10
- Website: Official website

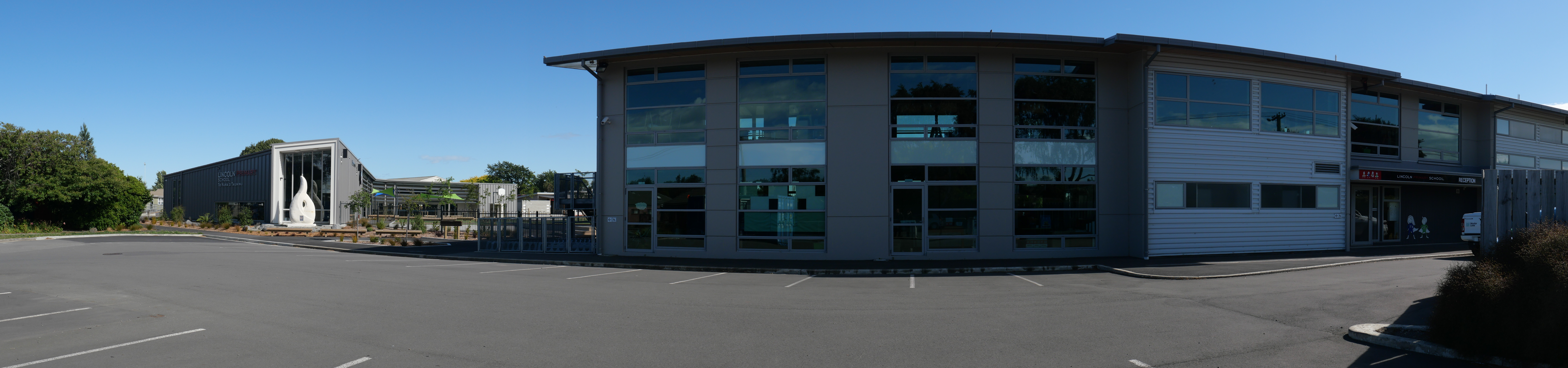
Lincoln Primary School, 2020

Lincoln Primary School / Te Kura o Tauhinu is a co-educational school based in Lincoln, New Zealand located on the Canterbury Plains to the west of Banks Peninsula, 22 kilometers south of Christchurch. The school is divided into five Syndicates: Syndicate 1 for Year 0, 1 and 2 students (5 to 7 year olds), Syndicate 2 for Year 3 and 4 students, Syndicate 3 for Year 5 and 6 students, Syndicate 4 for Year 7 and 8 students (11 to 13 year olds), and Syndicate 5 (Technology Centre). The Technology Centre caters for nine other partnership schools from Selwyn and the surrounding area.

Lincoln Primary School is situated next to Lincoln High School, a short distance from Lincoln University.

== Early history ==
The original school was built in 1865 and opened in 1866. It consisted of one room, 30 x 17 ft (5.2 m) and a porch. The head's house had 4 rooms. At the time 10 children attended the school but this rose to 34 children within three months.
In 1875 with a school roll of 109 children, the school was extended to 1,460 square feet (136 m^{2}). In 1882 the school was further enlarged to 1,834 square feet (170.4 m^{2}). The school roll fluctuated greatly during the early years. 155 children attended the school in 1883, 202 children in 1891, but only 130 children were enrolled in 1896.

== Further Growth ==
By 1895 the swimming baths had been opened which has remained practically unchanged to the present day. Over the following years the district was growing and by 1902 Lincoln had a population of 500 people. In 1903 the District High School was added to the school with 23 students enrolled. In 1906 technical facilities were added with a woodwork room and a cookery room. In 1959 the District High School was changed to a full High School and separated from the Primary School. Through the schools link with Lincoln Technical School in England, Lincoln Primary School and the newly formed High School adopted the St George's cross, and the fleur-de-lis, as their emblem. A new building, which includes nine new classrooms and the Information Centre/library, was officially opened in October 2010.

A new modular learning space was completed at the end of Term 3, 2016 to cater for the increasing student roll. At the same time the former Lincoln Club at 24 Edward Street was refurbished to become the new Junior Campus catering for the Years 0 – 2 classes. The official blessings for both new learning spaces were celebrated on 10 November 2016.
