= New Zealand Institute for Bioeconomy Science =

New Zealand research organisation

Agency overview
- Formed: July 1, 2025
- Preceding agencies: AgResearch; Landcare Research; Plant & Food Research; Scion
- Website: https://www.bioeconomyscience.co.nz/

The formation of the New Zealand Institute for Bioeconomy Science, trading as the Bioeconomy Science Institute (BSI), was announced as part of the New Zealand science sector reforms. The BSI came into being as a Crown Research Institute (CRI) on 1 July 2025, and is made up of the disestablished CRIs Manaaki Whenua Landcare Research, AgResearch, Plant & Food Research and Scion. The new organization will later become a Public Research Organisation once legislation to enact the change has passed through the New Zealand parliament. The focus of NZIBS will be "advancing innovation in agriculture, aquaculture, forestry, biotechnology and manufacturing; protecting ecosystems from biosecurity threats and climate risks; and developing new bio-based technologies and products".

== Board ==
In May 2025, Minister Shane Reti announced the chair of the new board would be Barry Harris, previously of NIWA. Kim Wallace of AgResearch will be deputy chair, with board members of Candace Kinser, Andrew Morrison, and Gray Baldwin.

== History ==
On 2 July 2025, the Bioeconomy Science Institute's new CEO Mark Piper confirmed that the organisation's headquarters would be based at AgResearch's Tuhiraki building at Lincoln University's campus in Lincoln near Christchurch. Piper said that the organisation would retain a distributed leadership since it has many sites and facilities across New Zealand. The new headquarters would also be near Manaaki Whenua and Plant & Food Research's facilities in Lincoln. In addition, the Scion would relocate from its Christchurch facility to the Tuhiraki building.

On 27 February 2026, the Bioeconomy Science Institute confirmed that it would cut 134 jobs including 86 science roles and 48 financial and administrative roles. Public Service Association national secretary Fleur Fitzsimons expressed concerns that the loss of science jobs at the Institute could lead to a brain drain that would hurt the government's goals of boosting economic growth.
