= Global Research Council =

International science organization

The Global Research Council is a virtual organization through which the heads of national science funding agencies from several countries meet to discuss cooperation, review practices, and promote research on, and directions for, scientific funding worldwide.

During its Second Annual Global Meeting in May 2013, the council endorsed an Action Plan towards Open Access to Publications based on the principles of public results for public spending, researcher awareness and education, and support through a policy of open access publishing.

As of 2024, the governing board is made up of three representatives from the Americas three from Asia-Pacific region, three from Europe, one from the Middle East and North Africa, and two from sub-saharan Africa.

Governing board members include:

- Americas: Alejandro Adem, Daniel Salamone, Sethuraman Panchanathan
- Asia–Pacific: Tsuyoshi Sugino, Prue Williams, Agus Haryono
- Europe: Katja Becker, Mari Sundli Tveit, Marcel Levi, İsmail Doğan
- Middle East and North Africa: Munir Eldesouki
- Sub-Saharan Africa: Fulufhelo Nelwamondo, Yaya Sangare
