= Industrial Research Limited =

New Zealand research institute

- Te Tauihu Pūtaiao
- Industrial Research Limited logo

Agency overview
- Formed: 1 April 1992
- Preceding agency: DSIR
- Dissolved: 1 February 2013
- Superseding agency: Callaghan Innovation
- Headquarters: 69 Gracefield Road, Lower Hutt; 41°13′57″S 174°55′8″E
- Employees: 350
- Agency executives: Shaun Coffey, Chief Executive; Michael Ludbrooke, Chair
- Website: www.irl.cri.nz

Original logo used 1992–2007

Industrial Research Limited (IRL) was a Crown Research Institute of New Zealand that was established in 1992 and merged into Callaghan Innovation, a new Crown entity, on 1 February 2013. IRL provided research, development and commercialisation services aimed at fostering industry development, economic growth and business expansion. It was established when the Department of Scientific and Industrial Research was disbanded and its staff and assets redistributed to form the research institutes in 1992.

Like many New Zealand entities, its logo incorporated a Māori identity, in this case "Te Tauihu Pūtaiao", where Te Tauihu is the prow or leading edge of a waka (Māori war canoe) and Pūtaiao means science. The phrase is a metaphor for the way science and technology can open up new opportunities for New Zealand businesses.

IRL was based at Gracefield in Lower Hutt, and had offices in Auckland and Christchurch.

After 10 years of operation, IRL commissioned a book, The Littlest Clue, which followed the history of several scientists and their projects as they took their ideas from the lab to the market place.

In 2009, IRL ran a competition What's Your Problem New Zealand? to win up to $1 million of research and development services, receiving over 100 entries.
