= Research Council of Norway =

Norwegian government agency

The Research Council of Norway
- Norges forskningsråd RCN

Agency overview
- Formed: 1993
- Jurisdiction: Government of Norway
- Headquarters: Oslo
- Employees: 360 (2023)
- Agency executive: Mari Sundli Tveit
- Parent agency: Norwegian Ministry of Education and Research
- Website: https://www.forskningsradet.no/en/

The Research Council (also the Research Council of Norway; Norwegian: Norges forskningsråd) is a Norwegian government agency that funds research and innovation projects. On behalf of the Government, the Research Council invests NOK 11.7 billion (2022) annually.

The Research Council is responsible for promoting basic and applied research and innovation. This is done by managing research funding and by advising the authorities on research policy, among other things through proposals for the research budget in the National Budget.

The Research Council works to promote international research and innovation cooperation, and has a number of schemes to mobilise Norwegian applicants for the EU Research and Innovation Programme. Other tasks include creating meeting places for researchers, trade and industry, public administration, public actors and other users of research.

The Research Council was established in 1993 through the merging of five different previously created research councils. The Research Council has approximately 360 employees (2023). It has local representatives in nine different regions of Norway. Since 23 June 2014, the Research Council's main office is located just outside of Oslo.

== Background ==
There were five predecessors of the council, each established as independent councils related to their own areas of interest: science and technology (1946), social sciences (1949), agriculture (1949), fisheries (1972) and applied social sciences (1987). The five were merged in 1993 to form the current council.

== Organization and Management ==
The Research Council is governed by the Ministry of Education and Research. Together with the Ministry of Trade, Industry and Fisheries they are responsible for about half of the funds that the Research Council manages.

Mari Sundli Tveit has been the CEO since March 1, 2021.

The Research Council's board of directors is appointed by the Government for four years at a time.

16 portfolio managers are responsible for portfolios of programmes and other activities in specific thematic or scientific areas. Overview of the portfolio boards' tasks and members.

== Research funding ==
Research organisations, companies and public entities can apply for funding through the Research Council, often in cooperation with other similar entities. International experts assess and rank the applications on behalf of the Research Council, and decisions on grant funding are made by the 15 portfolio boards.

The Research Council:

- uses a number of instruments to promote basic research and research-based innovation and commercialisation. Different grant application types and different structural schemes are used to support the needs of the research communities;
- has the strategic and administrative responsibility for the government basic funding received by about 50 research institutes;
- funds several centre schemes: Centres for Excellence in Research (SFF), Centres for Research-Driven Innovation (SFI) and Research Centres for Environmentally Friendly Energy (FME). In addition, several research centres receive funding from the Research Council;
- funds national investments in research infrastructure. This includes scientific equipment, laboratories, databases and scientific collections. The research infrastructure must be of national interest and can only be found in one or few places in the country.

== Research communication ==
The Research Council has a national responsibility for research dissemination and aim to contribute to the use of results from research. Among other things, the Research Council is responsible for the Research Days, which is a national annual science festival.

The Nysgjerrigper Science Knowledge Project for children in primary school will help provide children and young people acquire insight, understanding and interest in research, and the Young Researchers competition will increase interest in research and science among young people.

== The Research Council's Awards ==
- The Research Council's Dissemination Prize
- The Research Council Innovation Award

From 2016 to 2018, the Research Council presented the Award for Young Distinguished Researchers. Until 2016, the Research Council presented the Research Council's Prize for Outstanding Research
