= Bani Dhabyan district =

Coordinates: 15.0481°N 44.8717°E

Bani Dhabyan District
- District
- Interactive map of Bani Dhabyan District
- Country: Yemen
- Governorate: Sana'a

Population (2003)
  - Total: 16,262
- Time zone: UTC+3 (Yemen Standard Time)

Bani Dhabyan District (Arabic: مديرية بني ضبيان) is a district of the Sana'a Governorate, Yemen. As of 2003, the district had a population of 16,262 inhabitants.
