= Manaaki Whenua – Landcare Research =

New Zealand research institute

Coordinates: 43.640709°S 172.475441°E

Landcare Research
- Manaaki Whenua (Māori)
- Landcare Research logo

Agency overview
- Formed: 1992
- Dissolved: 30 June 2025
- Superseding agency: New Zealand Institute for Bioeconomy Science
- Headquarters: Lincoln, New Zealand
- Agency executives: James Stevenson-Wallace, Chief executive; Colin Dawson, Chair
- Website: www.landcareresearch.co.nz

Landcare Research (Māori: Manaaki Whenua) was a New Zealand Crown Research Institute whose focus of research was the environment, biodiversity, and sustainability. The New Zealand government placed the institute into the newly-formed New Zealand Institute for Bioeconomy Science on 1 July 2025.

== History ==
Manaaki Whenua was originally part of the Department of Scientific and Industrial Research (DSIR), but was established as an independent organisation when the Crown Research Institutes were created in 1992. As part of that process, it was semi-commercialised, and operated as a government-owned company rather than as a government department. The commercialisation led to greater emphasis on financial viability, and Manaaki Whenua is employed by various private groups to provide advice and information. It was chaired by Board Chair Colin Dawson.

On 14 May 2025, Minister of Science, Innovation and Technology Shane Reti integrated Manaaki Whenua into a new Public Research Organisation called the New Zealand Institute for Bioeconomy Science on 1 July 2025.

== Locations ==
The main site was in Lincoln, near Christchurch. There were also other sites at Auckland on the Tamaki campus of Auckland University, Hamilton, Palmerston North, Wellington, and Dunedin.

== Collections ==
Manaaki Whenua – Landcare Research held several collections of organisms that are of significant national importance to New Zealand. These holdings are now with the New Zealand Institute for Bioeconomy Science. Detailed information on all the specimens can be found though the Systematics Collections Data (SCD) website.

=== International collection of microorganisms from plants ===
The International Collection of Microorganisms from Plants in Auckland holds live bacterial and fungal specimens that are preserved under liquid nitrogen or in freeze dried ampoules. Currently there are over 20,000 specimens in the collection.

=== New Zealand Fungarium (PDD) ===
The New Zealand Fungarium (PDD) Te Kohinga Hekaheka o Aotearoa, located in Auckland, is the major collection of New Zealand fungi. It contains 109,584 dried fungal specimens, including all the New Zealand fungal type species. It is one of the most extensive compilations on the national fungal biota of any country.

=== New Zealand Arthropod Collection ===
The New Zealand Arthropod Collection (NZAC) or Ko te Aitanga Pepeke O Aotearoa in Māori. The NZAC has over 6 million specimens (1 million pinned and 5 million preserved in fluid) and has the most complete coverage of terrestrial invertebrates of all the collections held in New Zealand. In addition to its fundamental value to the science of taxonomy and systematics, the collection underpins quarantine and border control decisions (e.g., verifying the presence or absence of species in New Zealand); and contributes to listings of threatened insect species. The NZAC is held at Landcare Research's Tamaki site.

=== National Nematode Collection of New Zealand ===
The National Nematode Collection of New Zealand (NNCNZ) contains thousands of nematode specimens. It is contained within the New Zealand Arthropod Collection.

=== Allan Herbarium ===
The Allan Herbarium (CHR) Te Kohinga Tipu o Aotearoa at Lincoln, contains species from around the world but specialises in plants (indigenous and exotic) of the New Zealand region and the Pacific. It also has specialist collections of seed, fruit, wood, plant leaf cuticle, liquid-preserved specimens, and microscope slides. The oldest samples are the 91 duplicate specimens collected by Banks and Solander during Captain Cook's first voyage to New Zealand in 1769–1770.

There are currently over 550,000 specimens in the Allan Herbarium with 5,000–8,000 being added annually. Two-thirds of the specimens are of indigenous plants with the remainder divided between naturalised, cultivated, and foreign specimens. It was named for Harry Allan CBE, to acknowledge his contributions to New Zealand botany.

=== National New Zealand Flax Collection ===
Manaaki Whenua is kaitiaki of an ethnobotanical collection of traditional weaving varieties of harakeke (NZ flax, Phormium spp.) donated by Rene Orchiston of Gisborne. The 50 harakeke were selected long ago from natural stands and cultivated by Māori weavers for their special leaf and fibre properties. There are varieties specially suited to making kete, whariki, piupiu and cloaks.

== Research ==
Science included research into the processes that maintain New Zealand's ecosystems, enable natural flora, fauna and fungi to flourish, and protect soil and catchments for a range of production and other purposes. The impacts of disruption to ecosystems; biosecurity risks from foreign weeds, pests and micro-organisms; and contamination to land, water and air caused by the production of natural, manufactured or waste compounds are investigated. Research is also undertaken to develop tools to help mitigate inefficient resource use and excess waste, and systems designed to improve resource use productivity, lifestyle and business viability. Research focuses on six key areas:

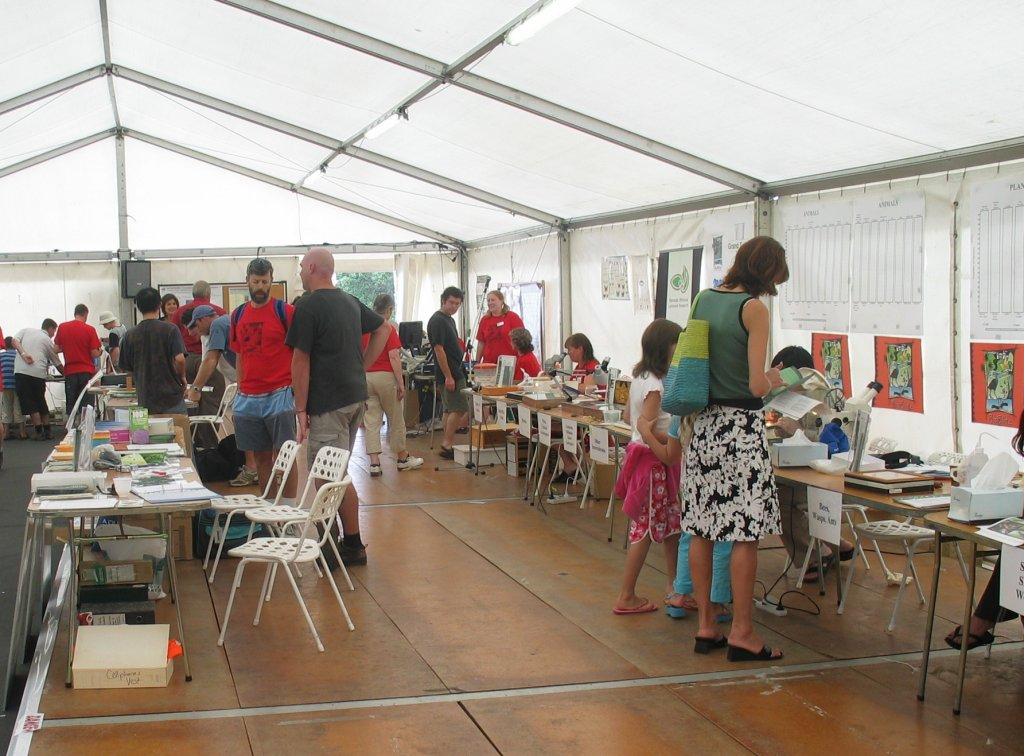
Base camp for the 2005 Auckland BioBlitz

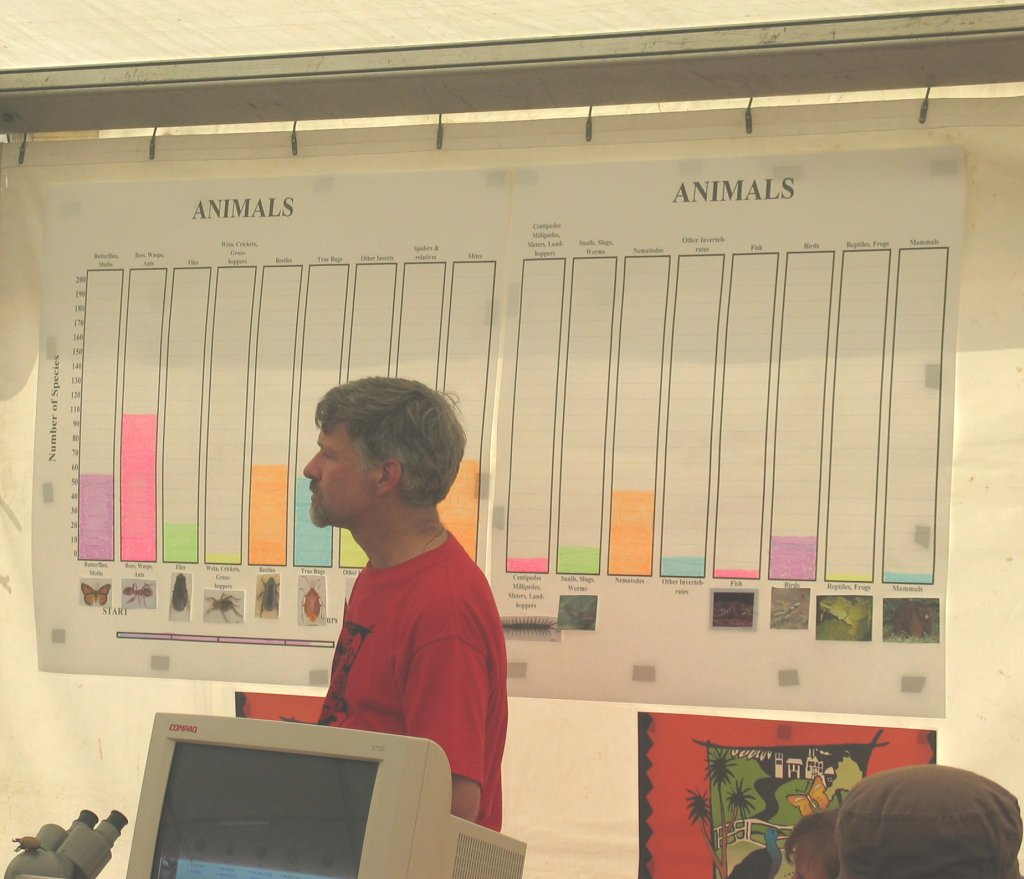
Peter Buchanan, organiser of the Auckland 2004 and 2005 BioBlitzes

- Conserving and restoring our biodiversity and the healthy resilience of natural ecosystems
- Reducing pest, disease and weed impacts in our natural and managed ecosystems
- Understanding, mitigating and adapting to the impacts of climate change
- Sustaining the long-term health of soils, waterways and landscapes for the continued viability of our rural environments
- Enhancing urban biodiversity and developing low-impact approaches for built environments
- Fostering environmentally sustainable and globally competitive business practices

=== BioBlitz ===
Manaaki Whenua organised several BioBlitz events – a survey of all species in a given area. The first New Zealand BioBlitz was held in the Auckland suburb of St Heliers on 30 April – 1 May 2004; in a remnant of native forest at Dingle Dell reserve, 925 separate species were found, and 631 species were found in a native bush gully at Meadowbank Primary School. A second BioBlitz in the Auckland Domain on 12–13 March 2005 found 1575 distinct species. Another BioBlitz occurred at Hagley Park in Christchurch on 8–9 April; here 1197 species were found. In 2006, BioBlitz was held in Hamilton; this event uncovered 948 species.

== People ==
The following people were associated with Manaaki Whenua Landcare Research:

=== Governance positions ===
- Colin Dawson, Board Chair
- John Rodwell, Deputy Chair

=== Researchers ===
see https://www.landcareresearch.co.nz/about-us/our-people/

- Ross Beever
- David A Wardle
- Gregor W. Yeates
- Janet Wilmshurst

== See also ==
- CarboNZero programme provided by Toitu Envirocare Ltd a subsidiary of Manaaki Whenua Landcare Research
