= Quotable Value =

Quotable Value Limited
- Type: State owned enterprise
- Founded: 2005
- Headquarters: Wellington, New Zealand
- Key people: Jacquie Barker (Chief Executive); David Nagel (Chief Operating Officer)
- Products: Property information and valuation services
- Website: www.qv.co.nz

Quotable Value Limited (QV) is a state-owned enterprise of the New Zealand government. Its main commercial operations are the provision of full market valuations.

== History ==
QV was originally established as a Crown-owned company on 1 July 1998 as Quotable Value New Zealand Limited. It was formed out of a former government department, Valuation New Zealand.

The original department's main role was the establishment of land values for local authority rating purposes. As part of reforms associated with its corporatisation, local authorities were permitted to choose their own valuers, requiring QV to compete.

QV became a state-owned enterprise in January 2005 and continues in government ownership.

== Services ==
QV's main services include:

- the provision of local authorities property valuations for rating purposes
- general property valuation services

QV operates under the QVV, QVR, Darroch and QV Online brands in New Zealand, and uses the Egan and QVA brands in Australia.
