= Soil Science Society of America Journal =

- Discipline: Environmental Sciences
- Language: English
- Edited by: Manoj Shukla

Publication details
- Former name: Soil Science Society of America Proceedings
- History: 1937–present
- Publisher: Wiley on behalf of the Soil Science Society of America (United States)
- Frequency: Bimonthly
- Open access: Hybrid
- Impact factor: 2.4 (2024)

Standard abbreviations
- ISO 4: Soil Sci. Soc. Am. J.

Indexing
- CODEN: SSSJD4
- ISSN: 0361-5995 (print); 1435-0661 (web)
- LCCN: 76643135
- OCLC no.: 4918122400

Links
- Journal homepage; Online access; Online archive

Soil Science Society of America Journal is a bimonthly peer-reviewed scientific journal publishing research on all aspects of soil science. It was established in 1937 as Soil Science Society of America Proceedings with J. D. Luckett as founding editor-in-chief. The journal obtained its current title in 1973. It is the flagship journal of the Soil Science Society of America. As of 2013, the journal is only available online.

Articles undergo double-blind review, where authors and reviewers remain anonymous to one another.

== Abstracting and indexing ==
The journal is abstracted and indexed in:

- AGRICOLA
- Biological Abstracts
- BIOSIS Previews
- Chemical Abstracts Service
- Current Contents/Agriculture, Biology & Environmental Sciences
- GeoRef
- ProQuest databases
- Science Citation Index Expanded
- Scopus

According to the Journal Citation Reports, the journal has a 2020 impact factor of 2.932.
