= Public Research Organisation =

Type of research organisation in New Zealand

A Public Research Organisation (PRO) is a type of New Zealand research organisation, established in 2025 as a reformation of the science and research system. The government announced in January 2025 that the Crown Research Institutes would be reorganised into three PROs, with a fourth to be established focusing on advanced technology.

== Establishment ==
The government announced in January 2025 that the Crown Research Institutes would be reorganised into three PROs, with a fourth to be established focusing on advanced technology. The PROs established from 1 July 2025 include:

- Earth Sciences New Zealand (NZIES): replaces the National Institute of Water and Atmospheric Research (NIWA), MetService (which would be merged into NIWA), and GNS Science;
- New Zealand Institute for Bioeconomy Science (NZIBS): replaces AgResearch, Landcare Research, New Zealand Institute for Plant and Food Research and Scion
- New Zealand Institute for Public Health and Forensic Science (NZIPHFS): a rebranding and reorganisation of the Institute of Environmental Science and Research
- New Zealand Institute for Advanced Technology, a new agency responsible for boosting economic development through advanced technology such as artificial intelligence and quantum computing.
