= New Zealand Institute for Advanced Technology =

New Zealand scientific research body

The New Zealand Institute for Advanced Technology (NZIAT) is a proposed scientific research agency that would be responsible for boosting economic development through investment in advanced technologies such as artificial intelligence and quantum computing.

== Functions and responsibilities ==
The NZIAT's stated purpose is to connect researchers, industry, and investors to generate research and innovation, strengthen New Zealand's advanced technology sector and promote economic development. The institute will focus on three areas including future magnetic and materials technologies, artificial intelligence and quantum technologies. The NZIAT will be based in Auckland with a network of strategic research investments across the country.

The NZIAT's investment priorities will be guided by the Prime Minister's Science, Innovation and Technology Advisory Council. The institute will also integrate existing government programmes including the Technology Incubator scheme, the New Zealand Product Accelerator, and the HealthTech Activator to facilitate its delivery functions.

=== Leadership ===
The Institute is headed by a leadership board consisting of establishment chair Stephen O'Connor (the director and deputy chair of New Zealand Growth Capital Partners), University of Auckland surgeon and biomedical engineer Professor Greg O'Grady, University of Auckland physicist Professor Cather Simpson and entrepreneur Arama Kukutai.

== History ==
On 18 July 2025, the Science, Innovation and Technology Minister Shane Reti announced that the New Zealand Government would be establishing a new Public Research Organisation called the New Zealand Institute for Advanced Technology to develop and commercialise the country's advanced technology industry particularly the artificial intelligence and quantum computing sector. NZIAT was established as a unit of the Ministry of Business, Innovation and Employment (MBIE) and is expected to become an independent entity by July 2026. During the announcement, Reti announced that the Government would allocate the Institute NZ$231 million worth of funding over the next four years focusing on scientific and technological research and development. The NZIAT's first investment was a research platform hosted by the Paihau—Robinson Research Institute in Wellington focusing on "Future Magnetic and Materials Technologies."

On 10 December 2025, MBIE announced that the NZIAT had received NZ$70 million to develop an artificial intelligence research platform over the next seven years, and $1.35 million to explore a new national quantum technologies research platform.
