= Mari Sundli Tveit =

Norwegian research executive

- Born: 1 May 1974 (age 52); Oslo, Norway
- Occupations: Rector of NMBU; Chief executive of Research Council of Norway

Mari Sundli Tveit (born 1 May 1974) is a Norwegian educationalist and research executive. Since 2021 she is Chief Executive of Research Council of Norway.

== Career ==
Born in Oslo on 1 May 1974, Tveit studied agriculture at the Norwegian College of Agriculture, had further studies at the University of Tromsø, and studied geography at the University of Bergen. She was rector at the Norwegian University of Life Sciences from 2014 to 2019.

She was appointed policy director of the Confederation of Norwegian Enterprise from 2019, and from 2021 she was appointed chief executive of the Research Council of Norway. In June 2026 she was appointed chief exexutive for another six-year period, starting from March 2027.

In 2023 she was elected president of Science Europe. She is board member of the Global Research Council.
