= CarboNZero programme =

Greenhouse gas certification scheme

The carboNZero programme and CEMARS programme are the world's first internationally accredited greenhouse gas (GHG) certification schemes under ISO 14065. They provide tools for organisations, products, services and events to measure and reduce their greenhouse gas emissions (otherwise known as carbon footprint), and optionally offset it. The programmes are owned and operated by Toitū Envirocare - Enviro-Mark Solutions Limited, a wholly owned subsidiary of Landcare Research (100% NZ government-owned).

== Programmes ==
There are two certification offerings for carbon footprinting:

- CEMARS (Certified Emissions Management And Reduction Scheme) certification is for organisations, products or services to make a measurement and reduction claim. Clients get to use a specific CEMARS certification logo and are certified against ISO 14064-1 for organisation or PAS 2050 for product or service
- carboNZero certification is for organisations, products, services or events to make a carbon neutrality claim. Clients get to use a specific carboNZero certification logo and are certified against ISO 14064-1 for organisation or PAS 2050 for products or service.

Both certifications require participants to follow the below key steps (CEMARS certification does not require offsetting):

- Measure - to establish a carbon footprint or GHG emission inventory
- Manage - to reduce GHG emissions
- Verify - to independently verify market claims.
- Mitigate - to neutralise remaining unavoidable emissions by purchasing high quality and verified carbon credits
- Market - to report or disclose achievements in reducing GHG emissions

The programme website also has simple calculators for households, travel, and schools to calculate their carbon footprint and purchase offsets.

== History ==
The carboNZero programme was created as part of a project called EBEX21 or Emissions Biodiversity Exchange in the 21st century. EBEX21 was established to assist landowners to retire or set aside marginally productive land and allow it to regenerate to create new areas of native forest. In order to compensate the landowners for lost production, EBEX21 applies strict rules based on the Kyoto Protocol to allocate voluntary carbon credits that are pooled and sold through the carboNZero programme.

In 2006, the carboNZero programme was made into a separate business unit of Landcare Research. In 2008, the CEMARS sister brand was created and a UK license partner, Achilles Group, began offering CEMARS to its customers in the UK. In 2011, the programmes became a wholly owned subsidiary of Landcare Research known as carboNZero Holdings. In 2013 carboNZero Holdings acquired the Enviro-Mark programme from Landcare Research and changed its name to Enviro-Mark Solutions Limited to reflect the company's wider vision for environmental performance improvement services. The programme now operates in the United Kingdom, Australia, Chile, United Arab Emirates as well as New Zealand.

Companies that have achieved CEMARS or carboNZero certification include Antarctic NZ, Department of Internal Affairs (NZ), Energy Efficiency and Conservation Authority (NZ), Department for the Environment Food and Rural Affairs (DEFRA, UK) including Kew Gardens, Environment Agency (UK), Scottish Parliament, INIA (Department of Agriculture, Chile), Eurostar, High Speed Rail, Auckland International Airport, NZ Post, and Fisher & Paykel Healthcare as well as universities, councils, district health boards including hospitals, and over 30 of the largest construction and utilities companies in the UK.

== See also ==
- Climate change in New Zealand
- Climate change mitigation
- New Zealand Emissions Trading Scheme
