= Lincoln, New Zealand =

Town in Canterbury, New Zealand

Lincoln
- Minor urban area
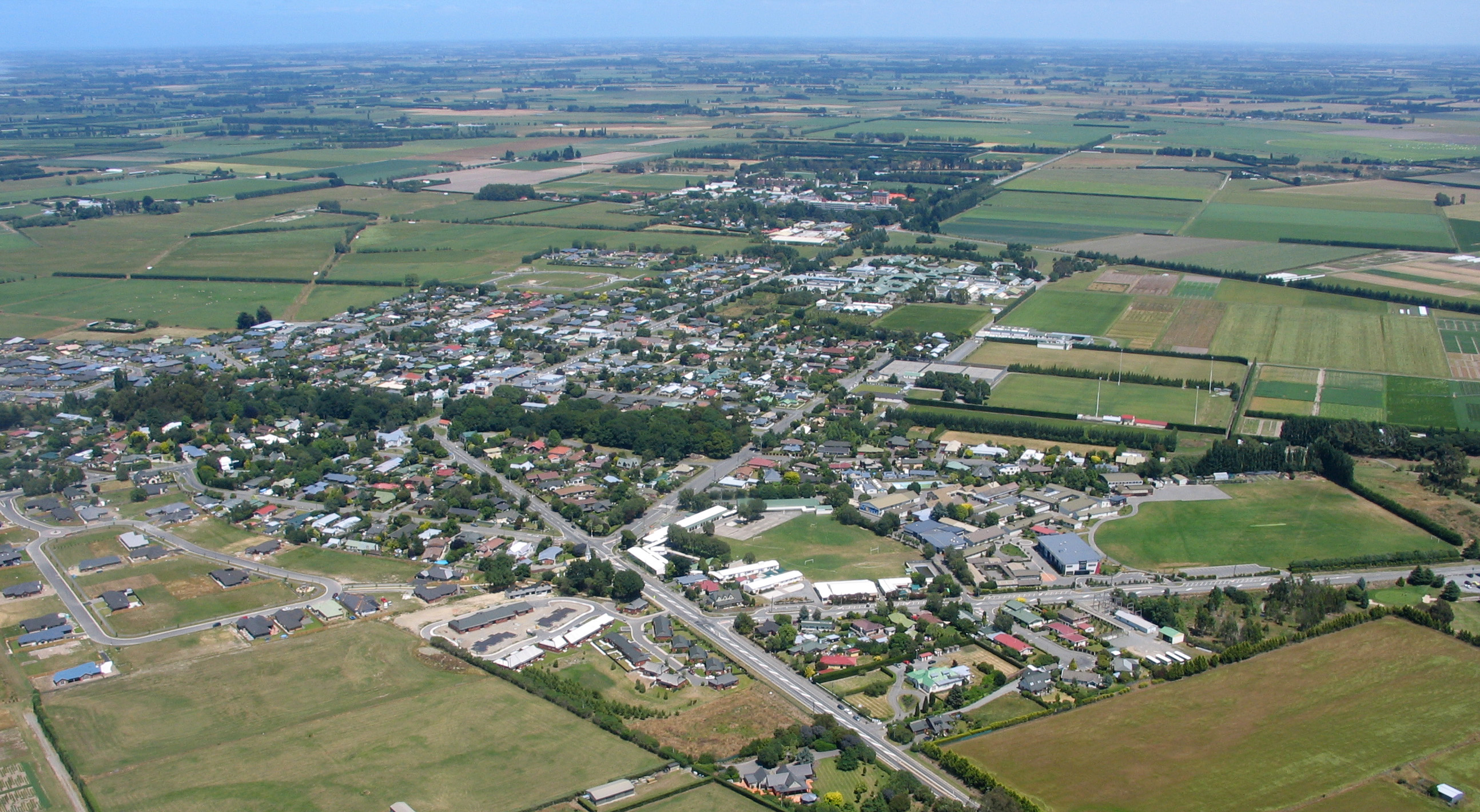
- Looking southwest across Lincoln from the air, December 2005
- Interactive map of Lincoln
- Coordinates: 43°39′S 172°29′E
- Country: New Zealand
- Island: South Island
- Region: Canterbury
- Territorial authority: Selwyn District
- Ward: Springs
- Electorates: Selwyn; Te Tai Tonga (Māori)

Government
  - Territorial authority: Selwyn District Council
  - Regional council: Environment Canterbury
  - Mayor of Selwyn: Lydia Gliddon
  - Selwyn MP: Nicola Grigg
  - Te Tai Tonga MP: Mananui Ramsden

Area
  - Total: 9.90 km^{2} (3.82 sq mi)
- Elevation: 10 m (33 ft)

Population (June 2025)
  - Total: 12,100
  - Density: 1,220/km^{2} (3,170/sq mi)
- Time zone: UTC+12 (NZST)
  - Summer (DST): UTC+13 (NZDT)
- Postcode: 7608
- Local iwi: Ngāi Tahu

Lincoln (Māori: Rīkona) is a town in the Selwyn District, in the Canterbury Region of New Zealand's South Island. The town is located on the Canterbury Plains to the west of Banks Peninsula, 22 kilometres southwest of Christchurch. The town has a population of 12,100 (June 2025), making it the second largest town in the Selwyn District behind nearby Rolleston.

Lincoln is part of the Christchurch metropolitan area; at the 2006 Census, 53% of employed Lincoln residents worked in the city. The town is home to Lincoln University, the oldest agricultural tertiary institution in the Southern Hemisphere and the smallest of New Zealand's eight universities.

== History ==
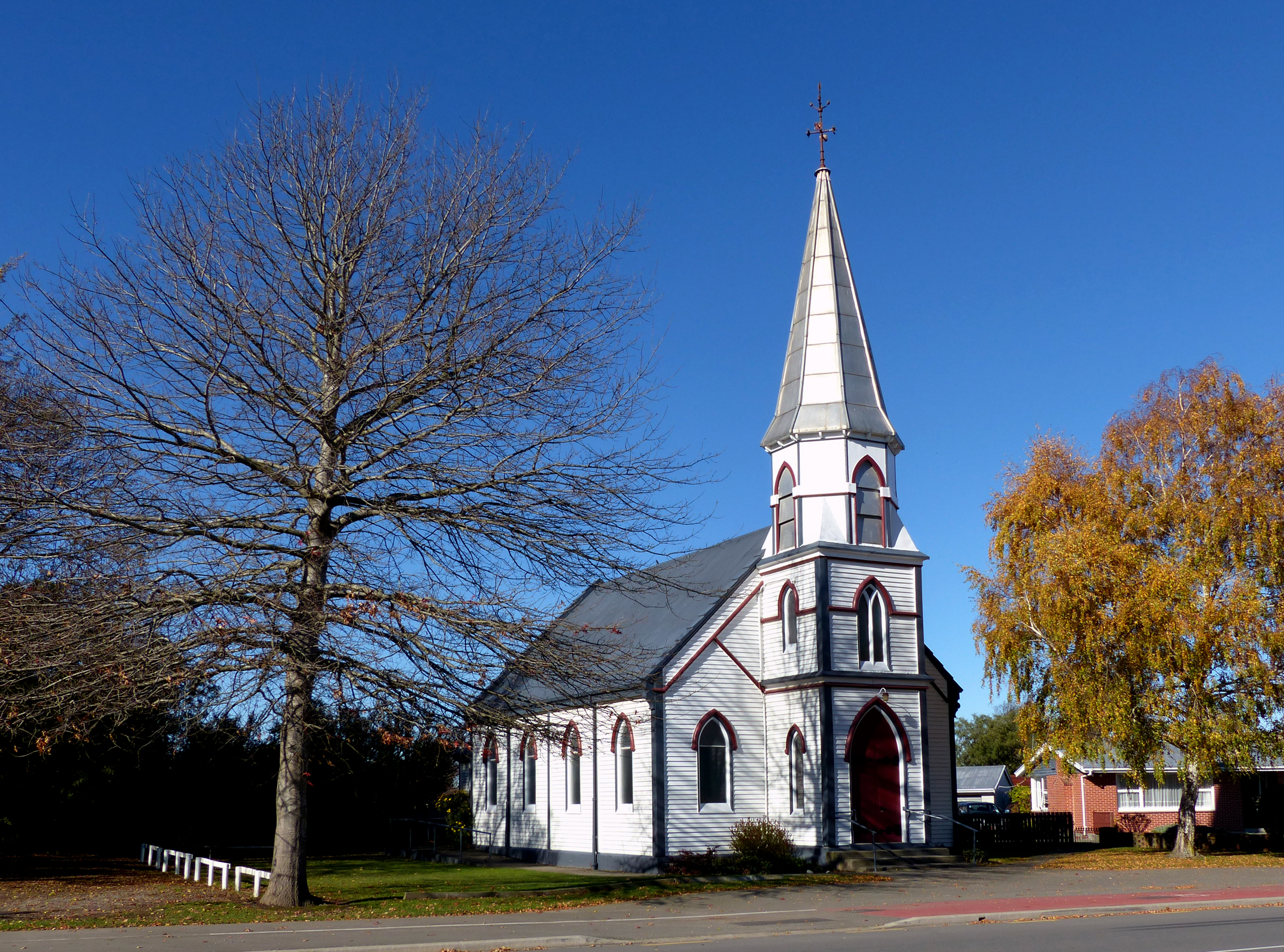
Union Church in Lincoln

In 1862, James Edward FitzGerald of 'The Springs' subdivided some of his freehold land for the new township of Lincoln, named after the Earl of Lincoln, a foundation member of the Canterbury Association and from 1851 a member of the management committee. The site of Lincoln on the L1 River would allow for a flour mill to be built to service the growing farming district. Lincoln was laid out in a grid layout and FitzGerald named the four belts North, East, South and West and the cross streets after his own children Robert, Maurice and William. The main streets James, Edward and Gerald were names after himself.
The new township steadily grew and by 1873 Lincoln had a post office, butcher, brewers, a baker and confectioner, a storekeeper who had a hotel, a wheelwright and a carpenter, and a blacksmith. The peaceful quality of Lincoln changed with the arrival of the railway line in 1875 and the opening of the Little River line in 1886.

On 26 April 1875, a branch line railway was opened to Lincoln from a junction with the Main South Line in Hornby. This line became the Southbridge Branch. Within a few years, Lincoln became a junction itself, with the Little River Branch diverging from the Southbridge Branch in Lincoln. This branch opened to Birdling's Flat on 16 May 1882 and Little River itself on 11 March 1886. On 30 June 1962, Lincoln became a railway terminus when the Little River Branch and the Lincoln-Southbridge section of the Southbridge Branch were both closed. The railway did not last much longer in Lincoln, closing on 1 December 1967. Today, the Little River Rail Trail is being established along the railway's old route. The Prebbleton to Lincoln leg of the route was opened on 30 November 2006. The trail is used extensively for recreation.

In 2021, a proposal to increase the size of the town by a further 5400 residents was proposed by the Carter Group. They intend to turn 186 hectares of farmland to the immediate south of the town into a new large subdivision. The proposal sets out a plan for homes to be built on sections which are between 400 square metres and 600sqm in size. Selwyn District Mayor Sam Broughton and Green MP Eugenie Sage spoke out against the development, however all but two councillors voted in favour.

== Notable people ==
Dame Carolyn Waugh Burns DNZM CBE, ecologist specialising in lakes, was born in Lincoln on 3 February 1942.

== Demographics ==
Lincoln is described by Statistics New Zealand as a small urban area, and covers 9.90 km^{2} (3.82 sq mi). It had an estimated population of 12,100 as of June 2025, with a population density of 1,222 people per km^{2}.

Historical population
Year	Pop.	±% p.a.
2006	2,820	—
2013	3,879	+4.66%
2018	6,522	+10.95%
2023	10,611	+10.22%
The 2006 population is for a smaller area of 9.06 km^{2}. Source:

Lincoln had a population of 10,611 in the 2023 New Zealand census, an increase of 4,089 people (62.7%) since the 2018 census, and an increase of 6,732 people (173.5%) since the 2013 census. There were 5,145 males, 5,436 females, and 30 people of other genders in 3,627 dwellings. 2.7% of people identified as LGBTIQ+. The median age was 36.3 years (compared with 38.1 years nationally). There were 2,274 people (21.4%) aged under 15 years, 1,998 (18.8%) aged 15 to 29, 4,899 (46.2%) aged 30 to 64, and 1,437 (13.5%) aged 65 or older.

People could identify as more than one ethnicity. The results were 84.2% European (Pākehā); 7.3% Māori; 1.2% Pasifika; 12.9% Asian; 1.4% Middle Eastern, Latin American and African New Zealanders (MELAA); and 2.2% other, which includes people giving their ethnicity as "New Zealander". English was spoken by 96.6%, Māori by 1.3%, Samoan by 0.2%, and other languages by 14.1%. No language could be spoken by 2.5% (e.g. too young to talk). New Zealand Sign Language was known by 0.4%. The percentage of people born overseas was 26.7, compared with 28.8% nationally.

Religious affiliations were 27.9% Christian, 1.3% Hindu, 1.1% Islam, 0.1% Māori religious beliefs, 1.2% Buddhist, 0.2% New Age, 0.1% Jewish, and 1.4% other religions. People who answered that they had no religion were 61.6%, and 5.1% of people did not answer the census question.

Of those at least 15 years old, 2,808 (33.7%) people had a bachelor's or higher degree, 4,302 (51.6%) had a post-high school certificate or diploma, and 1,227 (14.7%) people exclusively held high school qualifications. The median income was $51,200, compared with $41,500 nationally. 1,506 people (18.1%) earned over $100,000 compared to 12.1% nationally. The employment status of those at least 15 was 4,455 (53.4%) full-time, 1,359 (16.3%) part-time, and 165 (2.0%) unemployed.

Individual statistical areas
Name	Area (km^{2})	Population	Density (per km^{2})	Dwellings	Median age	Median income
Lincoln North	2.93	3,504	1,196	1,215	36.1 years	$58,900
Lincoln West	3.08	3,294	1,069	1,095	34.4 years	$37,300
Lincoln East	2.05	2,430	1,185	846	39.6 years	$51,500
Lincoln South	1.84	1,383	752	474	35.2 years	$64,700
New Zealand					38.1 years	$41,500

== Educational, research institutions and amenities ==
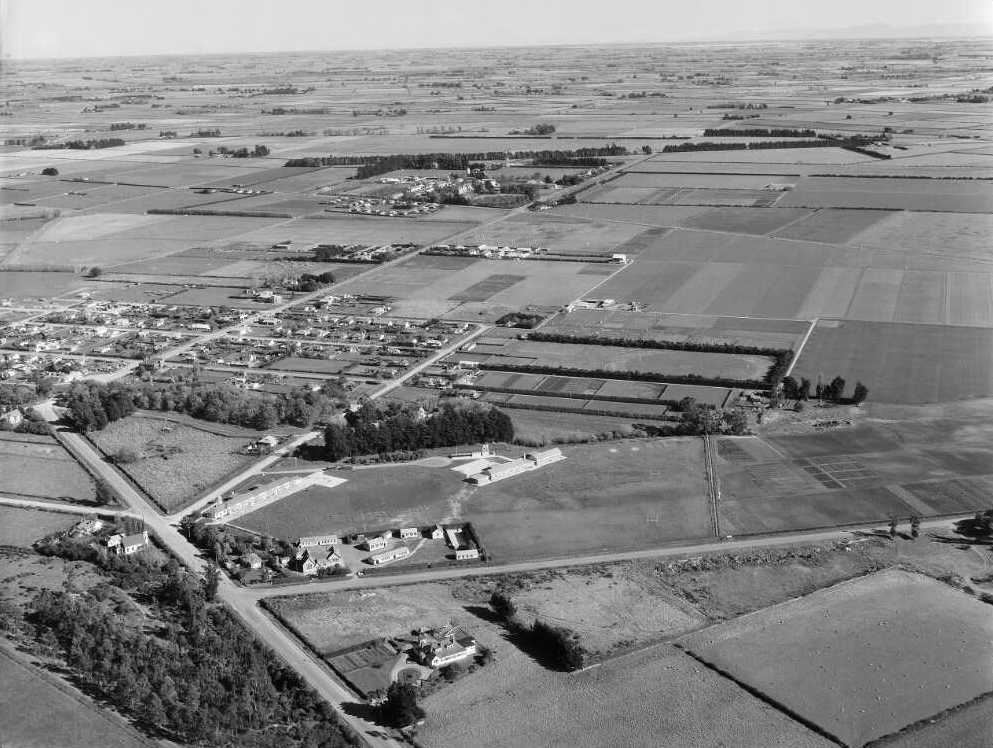
Lincoln photographed by Whites Aviation, May 1957

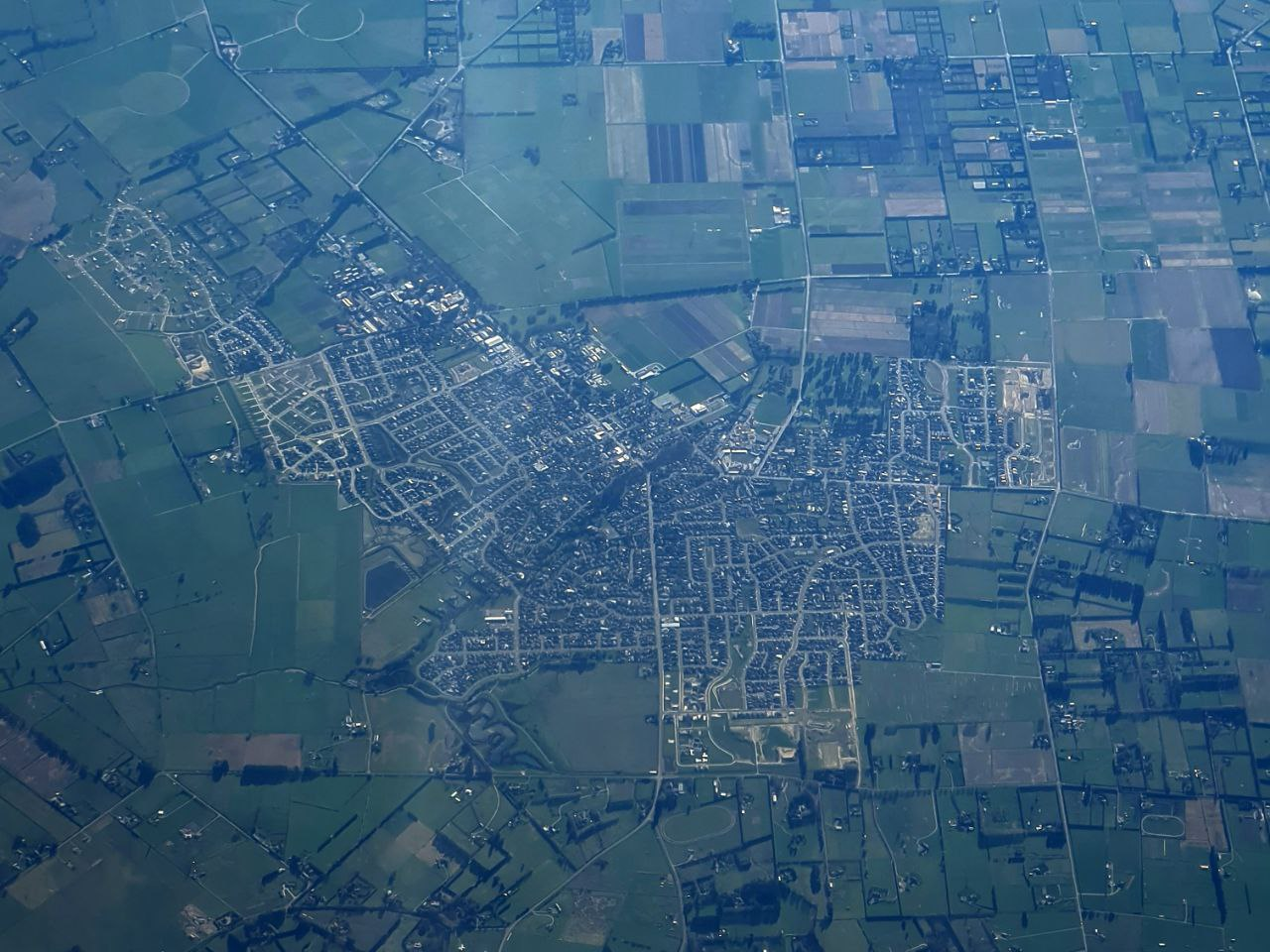
Aerial view of Lincoln, August 2022

Lincoln has three schools, two primary and one secondary.

- Lincoln Primary School is a state full primary (Year 1–8) school. It was established in 1866 and has a roll of 832 students as of July 2026.
- Lincoln High School is a state secondary (Year 9–13) school. It was established in 1959 and has a roll of 1,430 students as of July 2026.
- Ararira Springs Primary School is a state full primary (Year 1–8) school. It opened in 2019 and has a roll of 527 students as of July 2026.

Ararira Springs Primary School is the second primary school for the town. It was tentatively named Lincoln South School and open in February 2019.

Lincoln is the site of Lincoln University. As well as the university, there are a number of other research facilities in Lincoln, including AgResearch, Institute for Plant and Food Research, FAR (Foundation for Arable Research), and Landcare Research. The High Performance Cricket training centre is also based at Lincoln University. Over 400 people are employed at these organisations making Lincoln a busy little country village.

Lincoln also has a kindergarten and golf course.

Lincoln also hosts the first New Zealand supermarket to have wind turbines generating some of its power: Lincoln New World. The supermarket was built with a number of sustainable initiatives in keeping with the Enviro town it is servicing.

== Cricket ==
The New Zealand Cricket Board decided in December 1995 to create the high performance centre. Once they had made the decision, they quickly moved to find suitable premises and develop the high performance centre. The first intake of players occurred four months later. John Reid (former New Zealand cricketer) led the establishment of the High Performance Centre in 1996 as its first cricket operations manager.

Lincoln became the home to the New Zealand Cricket High Performance Centre. It is situated at Lincoln University. There are three cricket grounds. These include the Bert Sutcliffe Oval which was the venue for several high-profile matches: the 2000 Women's world cup and two under 19 world cup finals. Three national tournaments are held in at these grounds each summer. They are the Women's under 21 tournament, the men's provincial A tournament and men's under 18 tournament. Many other games and training camps are also held at the high performance centre.

Facilities also include a six lanes of indoor nets, a gym, accommodation for cricketers and multiple ground staff to keep the pitches in top condition. All weather facilities allow cricketers to train on grass pitches all year round. A marquee cover and climate control system were installed in 2018 to provide a winter training base.

== Climate ==
Climate data for Lincoln (1991–2020 normals, extremes 1881–present)
Month	Jan	Feb	Mar	Apr	May	Jun	Jul	Aug	Sep	Oct	Nov	Dec	Year
Record high °C (°F)	37.9 (100.2)	40.4 (104.7)	34.9 (94.8)	29.8 (85.6)	29.7 (85.5)	22.7 (72.9)	22.9 (73.2)	22.3 (72.1)	26.7 (80.1)	30.7 (87.3)	32.8 (91.0)	36.9 (98.4)	40.4 (104.7)
Mean daily maximum °C (°F)	22.0 (71.6)	21.9 (71.4)	20.1 (68.2)	17.2 (63.0)	14.7 (58.5)	11.7 (53.1)	11.2 (52.2)	12.5 (54.5)	14.8 (58.6)	16.7 (62.1)	18.5 (65.3)	20.5 (68.9)	16.8 (62.3)
Daily mean °C (°F)	16.8 (62.2)	16.8 (62.2)	15.0 (59.0)	12.3 (54.1)	9.8 (49.6)	6.9 (44.4)	6.4 (43.5)	7.7 (45.9)	9.7 (49.5)	11.6 (52.9)	13.3 (55.9)	15.5 (59.9)	11.8 (53.3)
Mean daily minimum °C (°F)	11.7 (53.1)	11.7 (53.1)	9.9 (49.8)	7.3 (45.1)	4.8 (40.6)	2.1 (35.8)	1.6 (34.9)	2.9 (37.2)	4.7 (40.5)	6.5 (43.7)	8.1 (46.6)	10.5 (50.9)	6.8 (44.3)
Record low °C (°F)	−0.7 (30.7)	−0.3 (31.5)	−1.9 (28.6)	−4.4 (24.1)	−6.3 (20.7)	−7.3 (18.9)	−8.5 (16.7)	−6.9 (19.6)	−7.2 (19.0)	−5.9 (21.4)	−2.7 (27.1)	−1.2 (29.8)	−8.5 (16.7)
Average rainfall mm (inches)	42.9 (1.69)	37.1 (1.46)	44.2 (1.74)	54.0 (2.13)	57.2 (2.25)	63.9 (2.52)	52.8 (2.08)	54.7 (2.15)	39.3 (1.55)	46.8 (1.84)	46.2 (1.82)	48.8 (1.92)	587.9 (23.15)
Source: NIWA
