= Caravan Tours =

American tourism company

Caravan Tours is one of the oldest guided tour companies in the United States, having begun selling escorted travel tours in 1952. The company has been under the same family management and ownership since then. The company's tours are popular, and they frequently sell-out, especially in the summertime and fall.

In 1966, the television journalist Roger Mudd hosted a two-hour travel special on CBS, utilizing Caravan Tours for the production. The success of that show inspired the 1969 romantic comedy film If It's Tuesday, This Must Be Belgium.

Caravan is the largest tour operator to Panama and Nova Scotia.

Caravan's Costa Rica tour is recommended by Mailpound, an information resource for travel agents. It is also recommended for families by Homeschool Magazine.

Caravan Tours is a member of the American Society of Travel Agents, the National Tour Association, Cruise Lines International Association, and an allied member of the Alliance of Canadian Travel Agencies.
