= AgResearch =

New Zealand research institute

- Āta mātai, mātai whetū

Agency overview
- Formed: 1992
- Dissolved: 30 June 2025
- Superseding agency: New Zealand Institute for Bioeconomy Science
- Headquarters: Lincoln, Canterbury, New Zealand
- Agency executives: Dr. Sue Bidrose, Chief Executive; Dr. Paul Reynolds, QSO, Chair
- Website: www.agresearch.co.nz

AgResearch Ltd (formerly known as New Zealand Pastoral Agriculture Research Institute Limited) was one of New Zealand's largest Crown Research Institutes with over 700 staff and revenue of NZ$160.7 million in the year to June 2014. The New Zealand Government merged the institute into the New Zealand Institute for Bioeconomy Science on 1 July 2025.

== Main areas of research ==
AgResearch existed to serve the agriculture and biotechnology sectors of New Zealand industry. This function has transferred to the New Zealand Institute for Bioeconomy Science.

== History ==
AgResearch was created along with New Zealand's other Crown Research Institutes in 1992. In AgResearch's case, this was largely by merging the pastoral agriculture-related portions of MAFTech (the research arm of the then Ministry of Agriculture and Fisheries) which had predominantly carried out animal research, with the agriculture-related portions of DSIR, which had predominantly carried out research on forage plants.

AgResearch has grown over time by acquiring research organisations "down" the value stream from its initial on-farm emphasis, such as the former Meat Industry Research Institute of New Zealand (MIRINZ) in 1999 and the former Wool Research Organisation of New Zealand (WRONZ, which had been rebranded as Canesis) in 2007.

In March 2009 AgResearch announced that it planned to merge with Lincoln University, but that was subsequently changed to an intention to form a joint venture.

A plan called "Future Footprint" was announced in 2013 to concentrate resources at the Grasslands site in Palmerston North and Lincoln campus near Christchurch. This involved the transfer of about 200 staff mostly from Ruakura (Hamilton) and Invermay (Dunedin) sites. There were reports that a substantial number of staff left the CRI after Future Footprint was announced and staff morale was poor with redundancies being considered in September 2015. About 50 scientific staff were made redundant in 2016. The government approved the restructure in June 2016. These changes were not eventually implemented due to staff backlash and resignations so the genomics teams remain at Invermay.

On 14 May 2025, Minister of Science, Innovation and Technology Shane Reti announced that AgResearch would be integrated into a new Public Research Organisation called the New Zealand Institute for Bioeconomy Science from 1 July 2025.

== Organisation ==
AgResearch's science capability is divided into six groups: Animal Productivity, Forage Improvement, Food & Bio-based Products, Animal Nutrition & Health, Innovative Farm Systems and Land & Environment. Science staff operate in five portfolio groups representing major sectors: Dairy On-farm, Dairy Pasture-to-plate, Meat & Fibre On-farm, Meat & Fibre Paddock-to-Consumer and Agricultural Policy & Maori Agribusiness.

== Locations ==
AgResearch has research campuses at locations around New Zealand, including:

- Ruakura, near Hamilton
- Grasslands and the Hopkirk Research Institute, near Palmerston North
- Lincoln, near Christchurch
- Invermay, near Dunedin

== See also ==
- AgResearch Invermay
- Ruakura
