= Scion (organisation) =

Former New Zealand research institute

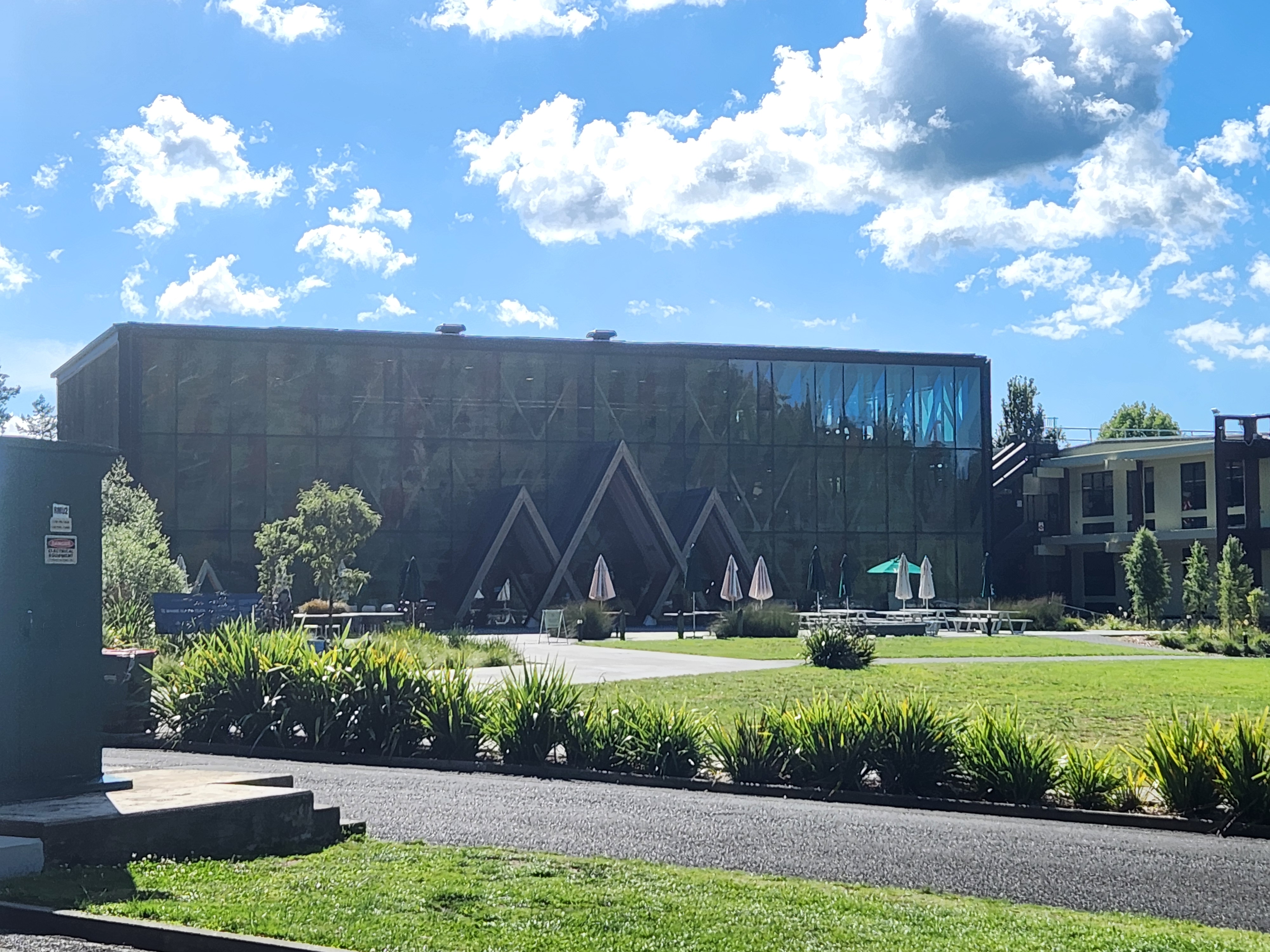
- Scion headquarters, in Rotorua, in 2026

Agency overview
- Formed: 1947
- Preceding agency: New Zealand Forest Research Institute
- Dissolved: 30 June 2025
- Superseding agency: New Zealand Institute for Bioeconomy Science
- Headquarters: 49 Sala Street, Rotorua, New Zealand
- Employees: 330
- Agency executives: Dr Julian Elder, CEO; Dr Helen Anderson, Board Chair
- Website: www.scionresearch.com

Scion, officially registered as New Zealand Forest Research Institute Limited, was a New Zealand Crown Research Institute with its primary areas of research, science and technology development being in the areas of forestry, wood products, wood-derived materials and other biomaterials sectors. The New Zealand Government merged the institute into the New Zealand Institute for Bioeconomy Science on 1 July 2025.

== History ==
The organisation was established in April 1947 as part of the New Zealand Forest Service, originally named the Forest Experiment Station. Its early research included work on timber drying, preservation and fibre production that remains relevant in the 21st century.

In the 1960s the organisation undertook intensive forest pathology research following the spread of red band needle blight among New Zealand pine trees. It undertook research in the 1970s into growing trees as crops, including improving techniques for mass production of seedlings and trials of growing trees on fertile farmland.

In 1987 the organisation became part of the new Ministry of Forestry. It became a Crown Research Institute in its own right in 1992 under the name New Zealand Forest Research Institute. In 2000, following increased interest globally in sustainable energy and the environment, the organisation extended its focus to include the development of renewable chemicals, materials and energy from forestry resources.

In 2005 the new trading name Scion was launched. Part of the rationale for the change of name was the extension of the organisation's research areas to include the development of biomaterials. The name Scion is a metaphor, which according to Scion's website, meant that "All parts of the Scion organisation share the same DNA, or the forestry legacy, that was established as part of the original Forest Research Institute."

In 2015 the Government announced it would invest $5 million in funding over seven years for a research partnership between Scion, industry body Future Forests Research, the University of Canterbury and the New Zealand Dryland Forests Initiative. The partnership would focus on developing more economic wood products from several tree species.

In 2022 Scion celebrated its 75th anniversary with a photography exhibition at its Rotorua office, which ran until April 2023. In 2023 Scion collaborated with iwi-based organisation Rotoiti 15 to work with rangatahi (young people) on protecting native species of trees from myrtle rust, and with Lincoln University scientists on the ability of forest floor microbes to absorb agriculture-produced methane. Scion also hosted a Symposium on the Transition to a Circular Bioeconomy in Wellington in February 2023.

In March 2024 Scion hosted the International Union of Forest Research Organizations conference in Rotorua. The conference focused on the use of vegetative propagation technologies in forestry, which was an area of Scion's research. It also addressed issues of sustainability, indigenous knowledge and climate change.

On 14 May 2025, Minister of Science, Innovation and Technology Shane Reti announced that Scion would be merged into a new Public Research Organisation called the New Zealand Institute for Bioeconomy Science from 1 July 2025.

== Areas of research ==
Scion carried out research into forestry and related sectors including biomaterials, bioenergy, waste and ecosystem services, and its research contributed to the growth of New Zealand's forestry sector. Its research into forest inventory methods over many years are used by commercial forestry companies.

In 2017 Scion's chief executive Julian Elder noted that the organisation's work now included genetics research and biomaterials research, reflecting the increased and changing uses of forestry products since the organisation was founded. Work since the 2010s included research into the impacts of climate change on forests, research into the use of unmanned aerial vehicles for forestry mapping, and research on converting waste pulp into carbon nanofibre.

Scion also carried out research into diseases impacting on the forestry sector. New Zealand's pine forests have been experiencing outbreaks of red needle cast since 2008, and Scion undertook research into the influence of temperature and moisture on the disease. Since 2017 it also collaborated with Manulife Forest Management on trials of copper as a treatment.

== Locations ==
As of 2023 Scion employed approximately 300 full-time equivalent staff at its main office in Rotorua, Te Whare Nui o Tuteata, which was opened by then prime minister Jacinda Ardern in 2021. Scion was one of the largest employers in Rotorua. The office was sited at Te Papa Tipu Innovation Park, and Scion entered into a memorandum of understanding with local tangata whenua Ngā Hapū e Toru. It also had an office on the campus of the University of Canterbury in Christchurch with close to 30 staff, as well as a smaller office in Wellington.
