= HortResearch =

New Zealand research institute

Agency overview
- Formed: 1 April 1992; 34 years ago
- Preceding agency: DSIR
- Dissolved: 1 December 2008; 17 years ago
- Superseding agency: Plant & Food Research
- Website: www.hortresearch.co.nz (inactive)

HortResearch (Horticulture and Food Research Institute of New Zealand Limited; Māori: Rangahau Ahumāra) was a Crown Research Institute of New Zealand. The focus of research in this company was mainly in the development of new fruit varieties and other food products. It was probably most recognised for its plant breeding of various kiwifruit varieties, including new cultivars of Actinidia (genus) chinensis and arguta (species). It also developed the Envy apple.

== History ==
HortResearch was originally part of the Department of Scientific and Industrial Research (DSIR), but was established as an independent organisation when the Crown Research Institutes were created on 1 April 1992. As part of that process, it was semi-commercialised, and operated as a government-owned company rather than as a government department.

On 1 December 2008, HortResearch was merged with Crop and Food Research to form a new Crown Research Institute, the New Zealand Institute for Plant and Food Research trading as Plant & Food Research.

== See also ==
- Smart breeding
