= New Zealand Institute for Crop and Food Research =

New Zealand Crown-owned research institute

Agency overview
- Formed: 1 April 1992
- Dissolved: 1 December 2008
- Superseding agency: Plant & Food Research
- Motto: Mana Kai Rangahau
- Employees: 370
- Website: www.crop.cri.nz (inactive)

The Institute for Crop and Food Research was formed in 1992 as a New Zealand-based biological science Crown Research Institute researching new knowledge in five main areas:

- sustainable water and land use
- high performance plants
- personalised foods
- high value marine products
- biomolecules and biomaterials

It had an annual turnover of approximately $53 million (2006) and a staff of 370. Its research funding came from a mix of local and international industry and government sources, and its research spanned both fundamental and applied research.

On 6 June 2003, a Piper Navajo Chieftain on a charter flight from Palmerston North to Christchurch crashed on approach to Christchurch Airport, killing the pilot and seven Crop and Food employees, and seriously injuring two others.

On 1 December 2008, Crop & Food Research (company number 547965) merged with HortResearch to form New Zealand Institute for Plant and Food Research trading as Plant and Food Research.
