= Crown Research Institute =

New Zealand scientific research body

In New Zealand, Crown Research Institutes (CRIs) were corporatised Crown entities charged with conducting scientific research. In January 2025, Prime Minister Christopher Luxon announced plans to merge the existing crown research institutes into three new Public Research Organisations (PROs).

== History ==
Crown Research Institutes date from 1992, with most formed out of parts of the former Department of Scientific and Industrial Research (DSIR) and of elements of various government departments. The dissolution of the DSIR, along with the government-imposed requirement that the CRIs become "financially viable" and operate on commercial lines, created a certain amount of resentment among some scientists.

On 23 January 2025, Prime Minister Christopher Luxon announced that the seven existing CRIs would be merged into three new Public Research Organisations (PRO):

- New Zealand Institute for Earth Science (NZIES): the National Institute of Water and Atmospheric Research (NIWA), MetService (which would be merged into NIWA), and GNS Science;
- New Zealand Institute for Bioeconomy Science (NZIBS): AgResearch, Landcare Research, New Zealand Institute for Plant and Food Research and Scion
- New Zealand Institute for Public Health and Forensic Science (NZIPHFS): Institute of Environmental Science and Research will be reorganised
- A fourth PRO focusing on advanced technology: the New Zealand Institute for Advanced Technology (NZIAT)
- Callaghan Innovation would be dissolved and its functions moved to other organisations.

The Minister of Science, Innovation and Technology Judith Collins described these reforms as the "largest reset of New Zealand's science system in more than 30 years." The names of the new institutions were announced in May 2025, alongside the announcement of Barry Harris as Chair of the NZIBS, and David Smol as chair of NZIES.

== Mandate and functions ==
The Crown Research Institutes Act 1992 states the purpose of a CRI as carrying out research, and that each CRI must do this for the benefit of New Zealand, pursuing excellence in all that it does, abiding by ethical standards and recognising social responsibility; and operating as a good employer. A CRI must do these things whilst remaining financially viable. The technical definition of financial viability changes from time to time, but as of 2007 focused on return on equity. The State does not expect CRIs to maximise profit, but simply to cover the costs of capital. This formula aims to ensure appropriate commercial disciplines whilst fulfilling scientific purposes.

The State charges CRIs with promoting the transfer and dissemination of research, science and technology. In other words, they have the role of "making a difference" with the research they produce. They do this via strategic, long-term relationships with sectors (the CRI Act set up most of the CRIs with a sector-orientation), to support, sustain, challenge and develop existing sectors and also to lead development of new sectors.

== Governance and administration ==
CRIs were originally governed under a standalone act, the Crown Research Institutes Act 1992. In 2004, as part of a wider reform of government entities, they were brought under the Crown Entities Act 2004 as a type of crown-entity company.

The New Zealand Government — via two Cabinet Ministers (the Minister of Research, Science and Technology and the Minister of Finance) — holds all shares in each CRI. Cabinet appoints a Board for each CRI. Each Board — intended to comprise business, "professional" and science expertise — operates according to the Companies Act as well as the CRI Act (1992) and other relevant Acts. Each Board produces an annual report and reports to the Crown Company Monitoring Advisory Unit (CCMAU), (part of The Treasury), which represents the shareholders. Parliament also scrutinises each CRI on an annual basis.

Day-to-day, however, CRIs operate as any commercial company would, acting within their strategic statement of intent (agreed with the shareholding Ministers) that aligns with the CRI Act purpose and principles.

The CRIs, along with Callaghan Innovation, cooperate as Science New Zealand. The Cawthron Institute is privately owned and operates independently but engages in partnerships with relevant CRIs, particularly in the aquaculture and seafood research. The Malaghan Institute of Medical Research is a registered charity which operates independently to the government but like CRIs relied on industry partnerships and government research grants.

== Funding ==
The Non-Specific Output Fund (NSOF) provided CRIs with some independent public-good research-funding streams from 1992 to 2005. The CRI Capability Fund (CF) replaced NSOF as from 1 July 2005. It provided public funding to maintain, enhance, and foster current or new capabilities. In 2010, the Government provided each CRI with core funding to deliver outcomes for the benefit of New Zealand. Core funding gives CRIs greater financial certainty and comprises a significant proportion of total funding available to CRIs.

== List of CRIs ==
Before the PROs were formed, there were seven active Crown Research Institutes. Callaghan Innovation was also included in some circumstances and they attended some joint meetings.

Crown Research Institutes of New Zealand
Official name	Common name (English)	Ingoa (Te Reo Māori)	Founded in Year	Homepage	Note	From July 2025
New Zealand Pastoral Agriculture Research Institute	AgResearch		25 February 1992	https://www.agresearch.co.nz/		NZIBS
Institute of Environmental Science and Research	ESR		1 July 1992	https://www.esr.cri.nz/	Formerly known as the Institute of Environmental Health and Forensic Science. Renamed in 1993.	NZIPHFS
Institute of Geological and Nuclear Science	GNS Science	Te Pū Ao	1 July 1992	https://www.gns.cri.nz/		NZIES
Landcare Research	Landcare Research	Manaaki Whenua	1 July 1992	https://www.landcareresearch.co.nz/	Known as "Landcare Research--Manaaki Whenua" since 2018	NZIBS
National Institute of Water and Atmospheric Research	NIWA	Taihoro Nukurangi	24 February 1992	https://niwa.co.nz/		NZIES
New Zealand Institute for Plant and Food Research	Plant and Food Research	Rangahau Ahumāra Kai	1 December 2008	https://www.plantandfood.com/	Formerly Crop & Food Research and HortResearch.	NZIBS
New Zealand Forest Research Institute Limited	Scion		April 1947	https://www.scionresearch.com/	Formerly known as Forest Experiment Station, part of the New Zealand Forest Service and then Ministry of Forestry. Operating independently as a CRI since 1992. Known as "Scion" since 2005.	NZIBS
Advanced Technology Institute	Callaghan Innovation	Te Pokapū Auaha	1 February 2013	https://www.callaghaninnovation.govt.nz/	Industrial Research Limited (IRL) established as a CRI on 1 April 1992 was merged into Callaghan Innovation on 1 February 2013. Formerly known as Advanced Technology Institute.	–

The Institute for Social Research and Development (known as NZISRD or SR&D or "Te Kura Kōkiri, Rangahau-ā-Iwi o Aotearoa") was disestablished in 1995 after failing to achieve financial viability. (Not be confused with the UN agency of similar name.)

== See also ==
- Kiwi Advanced Research and Education Network, now REANNZ
- ARENA
