= Minister of Science, Innovation and Technology =

New Zealand minister of the Crown

- Coat of arms of New Zealand

- Flag of New Zealand

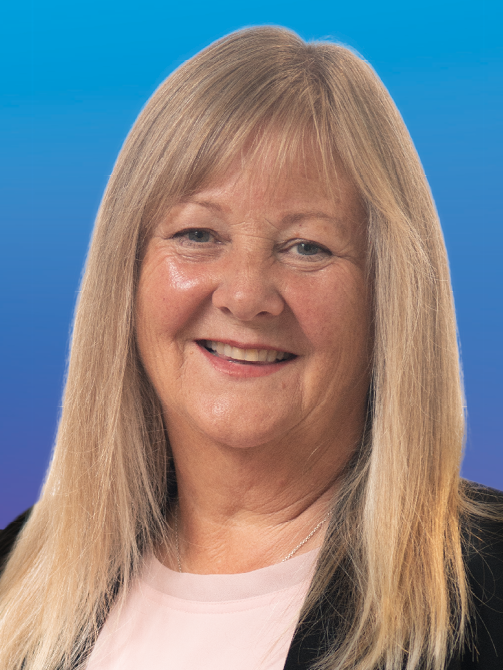
- Incumbent; Penny Simmonds since 7 April 2026
- Ministry of Science and Innovation
- Style: The Honourable
- Member of: Cabinet of New Zealand; Executive Council
- Reports to: Prime Minister of New Zealand
- Appointer: Governor-General of New Zealand
- Term length: At His Majesty's pleasure
- Formation: 1 September 1926
- First holder: Gordon Coates
- Salary: $288,900
- Website: www.beehive.govt.nz

The Minister of Science, Innovation and Technology is a minister in the New Zealand Government. The minister's responsibilities include leading the science and innovation system and setting the direction for government investment.

The minister has oversight of the Crown Research Institutes, Callaghan Innovation, the Health Research Council of New Zealand, the Marsden Fund Council and the Royal Society of New Zealand. The portfolio is serviced by the Ministry of Business, Innovation and Employment.

The current minister is Penny Simmonds.

== History ==
The portfolio was established in 1926, partway through the final term of the Reform government, as Minister in Charge of the Department of Scientific and Industrial Research. The first minister was the prime minister, Gordon Coates. The establishment of the portfolio accompanied the creation of the eponymous department.

The portfolio title has changed several times since its establishment. In 1963, the portfolio was renamed Minister of Science. A subsequent name change to Minister of Science and Technology occurred in 1975. The title Minister of Research, Science and Technology was used from 1989 to 2011, when the portfolio became Minister of Science and Innovation to align with the short-lived Ministry of Science and Innovation.

The title Minister of Research, Science and Innovation commenced from 2017 until 2023 when changed to Minister of Science, Innovation and Technology.

== List of ministers ==
The following ministers have held the office of Minister of Research, Science and Innovation.

Key

Reform Independent United Labour National

No.	Name	Portrait	Term of office		Prime Minister
1	Gordon Coates		1 September 1926	10 December 1928	Coates
2	Harry Atmore		10 December 1928	28 May 1930	Ward
3	George Forbes		28 May 1930	6 December 1935	Forbes
4	Dan Sullivan		6 December 1935	8 April 1947	Savage
4	Dan Sullivan		6 December 1935	8 April 1947	Fraser
5	Arnold Nordmeyer		29 May 1947	18 October 1947	Fraser
6	Terry McCombs		18 October 1947	13 December 1949	Fraser
7	Keith Holyoake		13 December 1949	26 June 1951	Holland
8	Clifton Webb		26 June 1951	25 September 1951	Holland
9	Ronald Algie		25 September 1951	12 December 1957	Holland
9	Ronald Algie		25 September 1951	12 December 1957	Holyoake
10	Phil Holloway		12 December 1957	12 December 1960	Nash
11	Blair Tennent		12 December 1960	20 December 1963	Holyoake
12	Brian Talboys		20 December 1963	9 February 1972	Holyoake
13	Les Gandar		9 February 1972	8 December 1972	Marshall
14	Colin Moyle		8 December 1972	12 December 1975	Kirk
14	Colin Moyle		8 December 1972	12 December 1975	Rowling
(13)	Les Gandar		12 December 1975	13 December 1978	Muldoon
15	Bill Birch		13 December 1978	12 February 1981	Muldoon
16	Ian Shearer		12 February 1981	26 July 1984	Muldoon
17	Bob Tizard		26 July 1984	9 February 1990	Lange
17	Bob Tizard		26 July 1984	9 February 1990	Palmer
18	Margaret Austin		9 February 1990	2 November 1990	Palmer
18	Margaret Austin		9 February 1990	2 November 1990	Moore
19	Simon Upton		2 November 1990	16 December 1996	Bolger
20	Maurice Williamson		16 December 1996	10 December 1999	Bolger
20	Maurice Williamson		16 December 1996	10 December 1999	Shipley
21	Pete Hodgson		10 December 1999	21 December 2004	Clark
22	Steve Maharey		21 December 2004	31 October 2007	Clark
(21)	Pete Hodgson		5 November 2007	19 November 2008	Clark
23	Wayne Mapp		19 November 2008	30 November 2011	Key
24	Steven Joyce		30 November 2011	20 December 2016	Key
25	Paul Goldsmith		20 December 2016	26 October 2017	English
Minister for Research, Science and Innovation
26	Megan Woods		26 October 2017	14 June 2022	Ardern
27	Ayesha Verrall		14 June 2022	27 November 2023	Ardern
27	Ayesha Verrall		14 June 2022	27 November 2023	Hipkins
Minister of Science, Innovation and Technology
28	Judith Collins		27 November 2023	24 January 2025	Luxon
29	Shane Reti		24 January 2025	7 April 2026	Luxon
29	Penny Simmonds		7 April 2026	incumbent	Luxon
