= Anita Wreford =

New Zealand applied economist

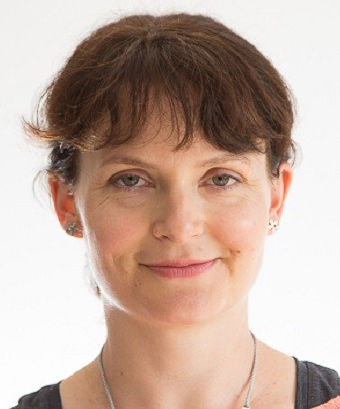
- Wreford in 2018

Academic background
- Education: Massey University; Lincoln University
- Theses: Genetic engineering and organic agriculture: perceptions of organic exporters, producers, and consumers (2000); The impact of international trade liberalisation on the emissions of agricultural greenhouse gases (2006)
- Doctoral advisor: Paul Dalziel, Caroline Saunders
- Other advisors: John D. Holland, Terry Kelly

Academic work
- Discipline: Applied economics
- Institutions: Lincoln University

Anita Barbara Wreford is a New Zealand applied economist, and is a full professor at Lincoln University, specialising in climate change adaptation.

== Academic career ==
Wreford completed a Master of Applied Science degree in natural resource management at Massey University, supervised by John Holland and Terry Kelly. She then moved to Lincoln University where she completed a PhD titled The impact of international trade liberalisation on the emissions of agricultural greenhouse gases in 2006. Her supervisors were Caroline Saunders and Paul Dalziel. Wreford did postdoctoral research in New Zealand and the United Kingdom, including at the University of East Anglia's Tyndall Centre and Scotland's Rural College. Returning to New Zealand, Wreford was a senior economist at Scion, before joining the faculty at Lincoln University, rising to full professor in 2022.

Wreford works as part of the university's Agribusiness and Economic Research Unit. Her research focuses on climate change mitigation and adaptation. She is the leader of the Deep South Challenge's Impacts and Implications programme. She was lead author on two IPCC reports, the 2019 Special Report on Climate Change and Land and the Australasia chapter of the IPCC Sixth Assessment Report. Wreford is on the Australian Journal of Agricultural and Resource Economics editorial board. She has provided policy advice at local and national government level within New Zealand, and has also contributed to the UK's Committee on Climate Change and the Scottish government's ClimateXChange programme.

== Selected works ==
- Adger, Neil; Suraje Dessai; Marisa Goulden; Hulme, Mike; Lorenzoni, Irene; Donald R. Nelson; Lars Otto Naess; Johanna Wolf; Wreford, Anita (2008). "Are there social limits to adaptation to climate change?". Climatic Change. 93 (3–4): 335–354. doi:10.1007/s10584-008-9520-z. Wikidata Q56836459.
- Wreford, Anita; Moran, Dominic; Adger, Neil (2010). Climate Change and Agriculture: Impacts, Adaptation and Mitigation. OECD. doi:10.1787/9789264086876-en. ISBN 978-92-64-08686-9. Wikidata Q58112233.
- Ruth Dittrich; Wreford, Anita; Moran, Dominic (2016). "A survey of decision-making approaches for climate change adaptation: Are robust methods the way forward?". Ecological Economics. 122: 79–89. doi:10.1016/j.ecolecon.2015.12.006. Wikidata Q58112207.
- Wreford, Anita; Adger, Neil (2010). "Adaptation in agriculture: historic effects of heat waves and droughts on UK agriculture". International Journal of Agricultural Sustainability. 8 (4): 278–289. doi:10.3763/ijas.2010.0482. Wikidata Q58056667.
- Moriondo, Marco; Bindi, Marco; Kundzewicz, Zbigniew; Szwed, Małgorzata; A. Chorynski; Matczak, Piotr; M. Radziejewski; D. McEvoy; Wreford, Anita (2010). "Impact and adaptation opportunities for European agriculture in response to climatic change and variability". Mitigation and Adaptation Strategies for Global Change. 15 (7): 657–679. doi:10.1007/s11027-010-9219-0. Wikidata Q58112241.
- Lisa Sharma-Wallace; Sandra J. Velarde; Wreford, Anita (2018). "Adaptive governance good practice: Show me the evidence!". Journal of Environmental Management. 222: 174–184. doi:10.1016/j.jenvman.2018.05.067. PMID 29843090. Wikidata Q57122811.
- Felix Schenuit; Rebecca Colvin; Mathias Fridahl; Barry McMullin; Reisinger, Andy; Daniel L. Sanchez; Stephen M. Smith; Asbjørn Torvanger; Wreford, Anita; Geden, Oliver (2021). "Carbon Dioxide Removal Policy in the Making: Assessing Developments in 9 OECD Cases". Frontiers in Climate. 3. doi:10.3389/fclim.2021.638805. Wikidata Q111136719.
