= 2009 New Year Honours (New Zealand) =

Annual awards for New Zealanders

- Previous: 2008 Queen's Birthday Honours; Next: 2009 Queen's Birthday Honours
- Type: New Zealand royal honours: New Zealand Order of Merit; Queen's Service Order; Queen's Service Medal; New Zealand Distinguished Service Decoration
- Date: 31 December 2008
- Country: New Zealand
- Total recipients: 193

The 2009 New Year Honours in New Zealand were appointments by Elizabeth II in her right as Queen of New Zealand, on the advice of the New Zealand government, to various orders and honours to reward and highlight good works by New Zealanders, and to celebrate the passing of 2008 and the beginning of 2009. They were announced on 31 December 2008.

The recipients of honours are listed here as they were styled before their new honour.

== New Zealand Order of Merit ==
=== Principal Companion (PCNZM) ===
- Professor Ralph Herberley Ngātata Love QSO JP – of Porirua. For services to Māori.
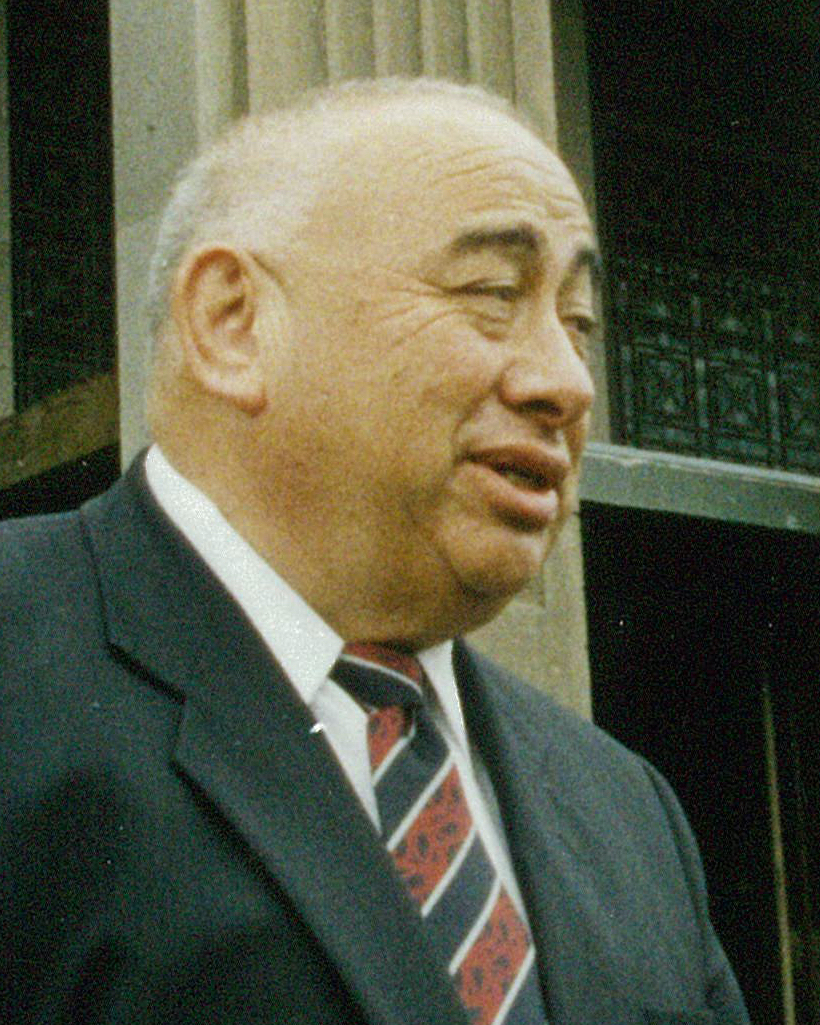
Ngātata Love

=== Distinguished Companion (DCNZM) ===
- Dr Claudia Josepha Orange OBE – of Wellington. For services to historical research.
- Professor David Christopher Graham Skegg OBE – of Dunedin. For services to medicine.
- Murray John Wells – of Auckland. For services to business and sport.
- The Honourable Margaret Anne Wilson – of Tauranga. For services as a member of parliament and as Speaker of the House of Representatives.
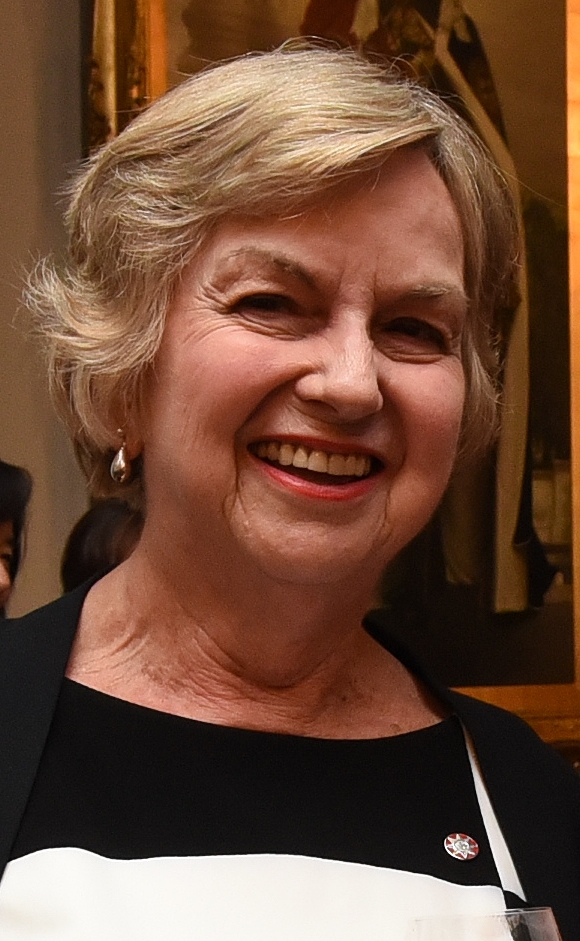
Claudia Orange

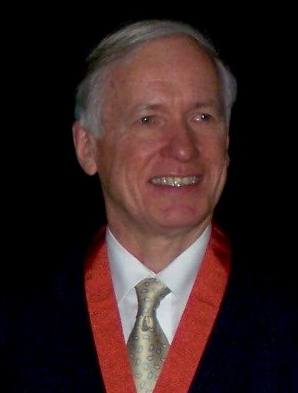
David Skegg

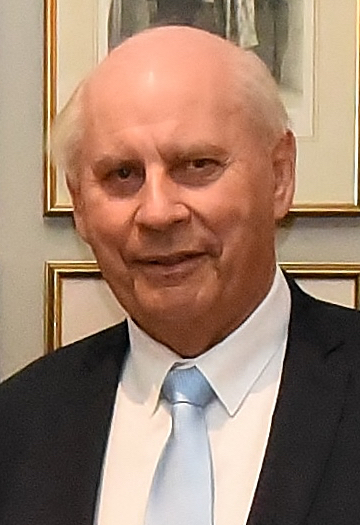
John Wells

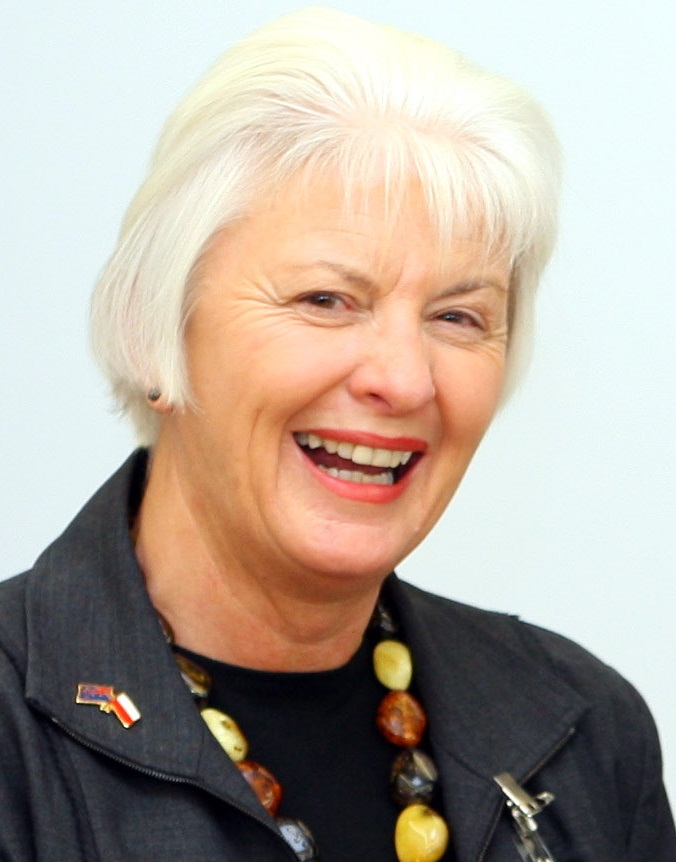
Margaret Wilson

=== Companion (CNZM) ===
- Brian Phillip Najib Corban QSO – of Auckland. For services to the community.
- David Finlay Currie – of Raglan. For services to sports administration.
- Professor Roberta Lee Farrell – of Hamilton. For services to biochemical research.
- Anthony Ian Gibbs – of Auckland. For services to business.
- Dr Ronald John Goodey – of Auckland. For services to otolaryngology.
- Emeritus Professor Jocelyn Margaret Harris – of Dunedin. For services to education.
- Meredith Jane Hunter OBE – of Renwick. For services the viticulture industry.
- Professor Ronald William Jones – of Auckland. For services to women's health.
- The Honourable John Arthur Laurenson QC – of Auckland. For services as a judge of the High Court of New Zealand.
- The Honourable Steven Maharey – of Palmerston North. For services as a member of parliament.
- Dr Mark Prebble – of Lower Hutt. For public services, lately as State Services Commissioner.
- The Honourable Michael David Rann MP – of Adelaide, South Australia, Australia. For services to New Zealand–Australia relations.
- Professor John Scott Werry – of Auckland. For services to child and adolescent psychiatry.
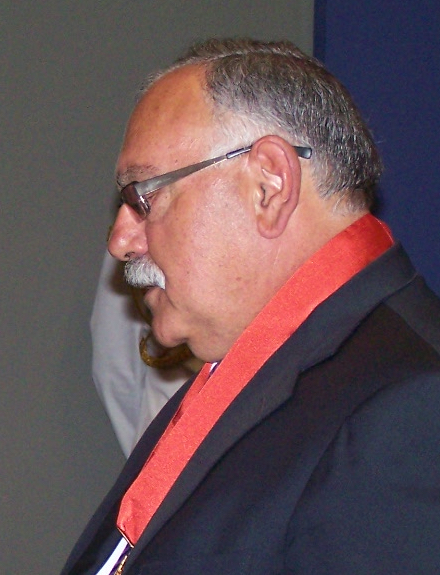
Brian Corban

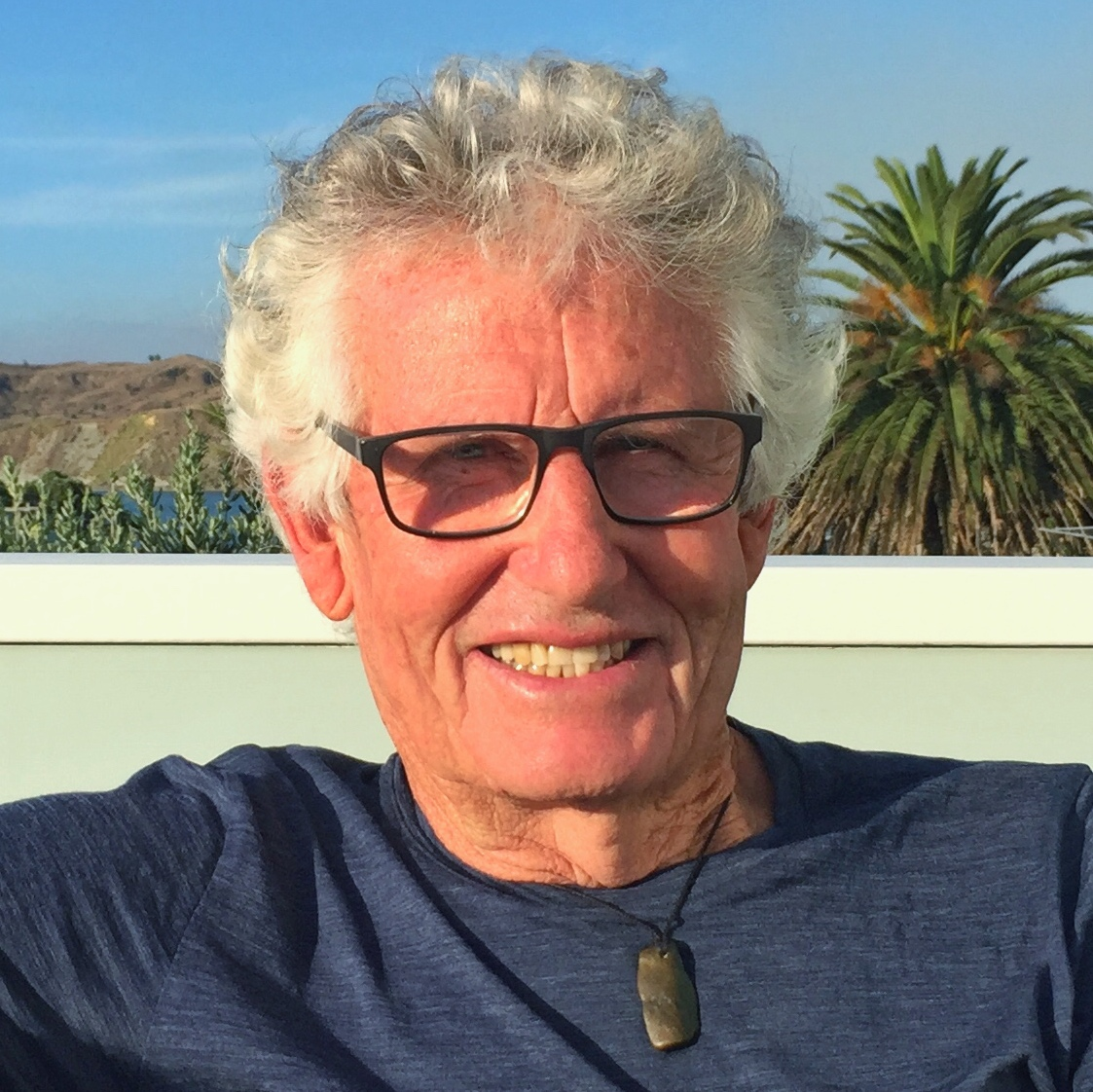
Dave Currie

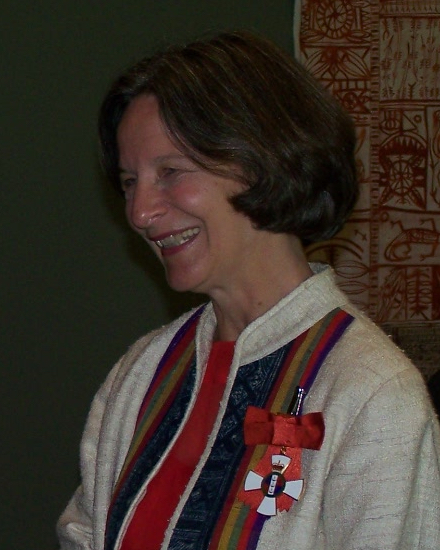
Roberta Farrell

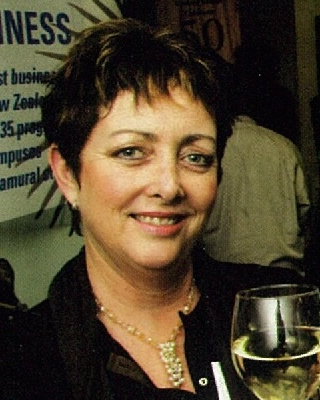
Jane Hunter

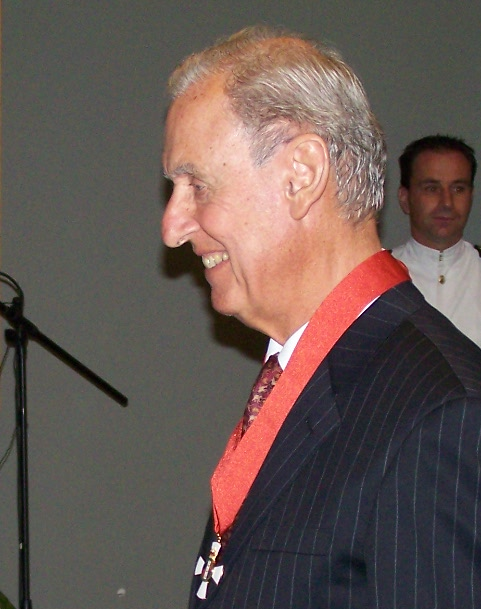
Ron Jones

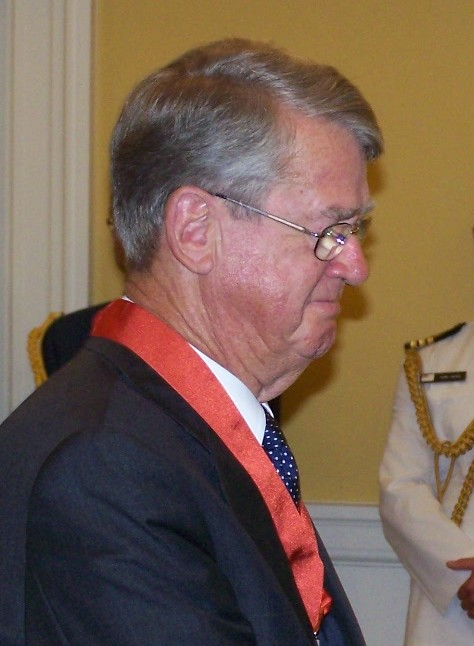
John Laurenson

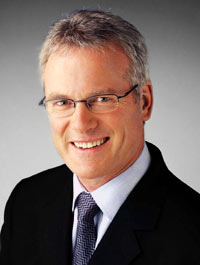
Steve Maharey

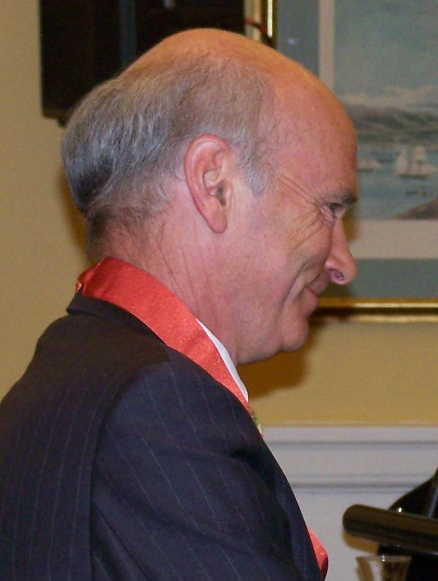
Mark Prebble

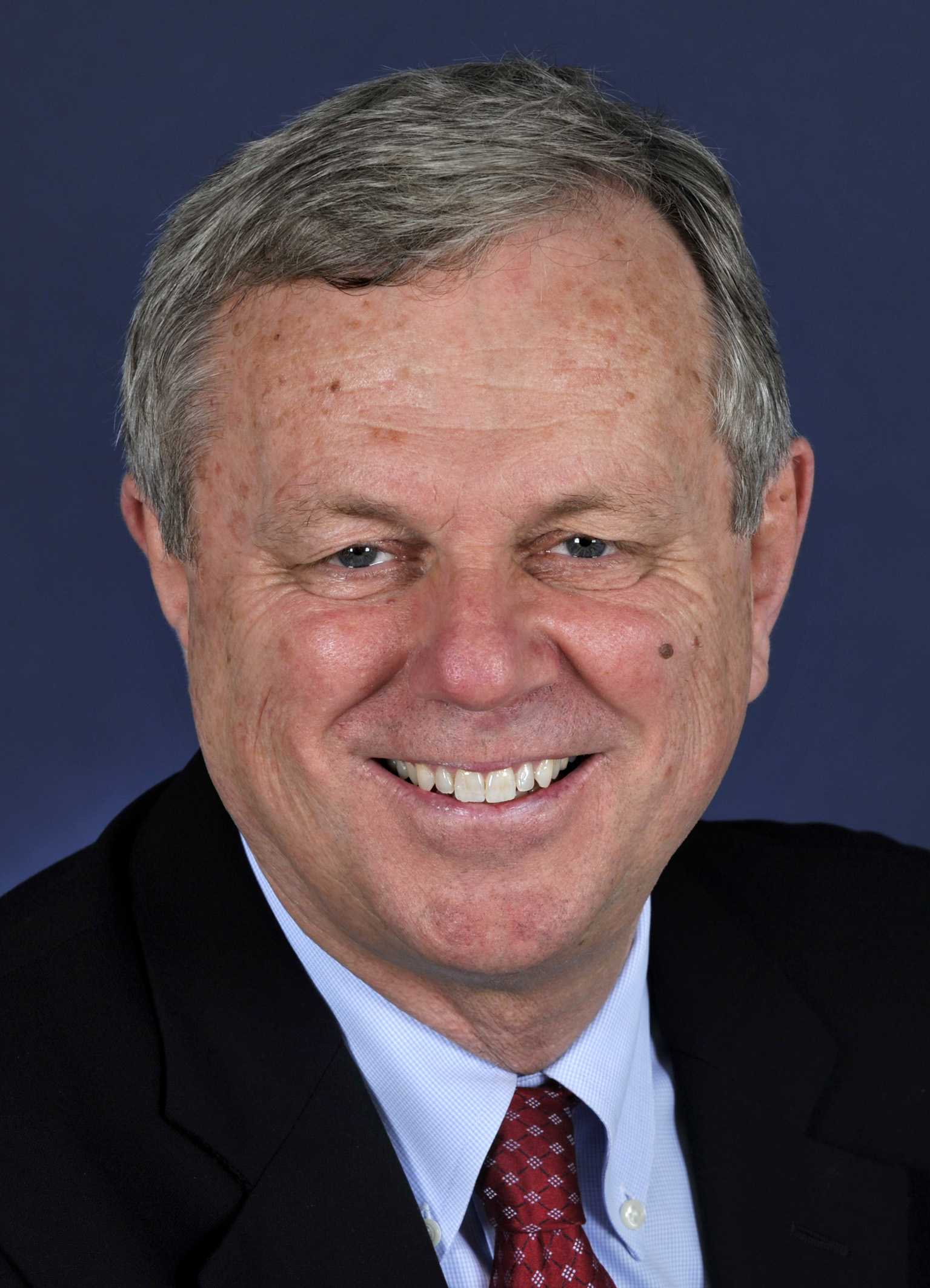
Mike Rann

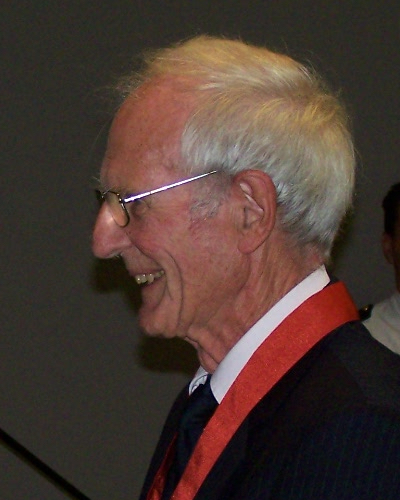
John Werry

=== Officer (ONZM) ===
- Thomas John Mitchell Ashley – of North Shore. For services to board sailing.
- Neil Cornelius Adrian Collins QSM – of Dunedin. For services to broadcasting, local-body affairs and the community.
- John Stanley Edgar – of Waitakere (West Auckland). For services to art, in particular sculpture.
- Peter Gordon – of London, England. For services to the food industry.
- Associate Professor William Dean Halford – of Palmerston North. For services to education.
- Professor Vada Harlene Hayne – of Mosgiel. For services to scientific and medical research.
- Professor Michael Donald Hendy – of Palmerston North. For services to mathematical biology.
- Professor Graham Lancelot Hill – of Wānaka. For services to medicine.
- Diana, Lady Isaac QSM – of Christchurch. For services to business, conservation and the community.
- Dr John Peter Langley JP – of Auckland. For services to education.
- Professor Alan Forbes Merry – of Auckland. For services to medicine, in particular anaesthesia.
- Lieutenant Colonel Christopher Bernard Marie Mullane (Retired) MBE – of North Shore. For services to Vietnam veterans.
- Professor Gareth J Parry – of Hopkins, Minnesota, USA. For services to neurology.
- Katharine Margaret Felicity Price – of Christchurch. For services to the arts and business.
- Dr William Alexander Robertson – of Porirua. For services to surveying.
- Associate Professor Bridget Anne Robinson – of Lyttelton. For services to medicine.
- Thomas Louis Rogerson – of Auckland. For services to the visually impaired.
- Professor Caroline Mary Saunders – of Christchurch. For services to agricultural research.
- Michael Stephen Seresin – of London, England. For services to the film and wine industries.
- Professor David Christopher Thorns – of Christchurch. For services to urban sociology.
- Valerie Kasanita Vili – of Manukau (South Auckland). For services to athletics.
- Emeritus Professor Alan Dudley Ward – of Newcastle, New South Wales, Australia. For services to New Zealand history.
- Dr Robert Arthur Sandel Welch – of Hamilton. For services to biotechnology.
- Richard Frank Wells – of Lower Hutt. For services to business.
- Professor Kenneth Geoffrey White – of Dunedin. For services to science, in particular psychology.

Honorary

- Mayumi Moriyama – of Tokyo, Japan. For services to New Zealand–Japan relations.
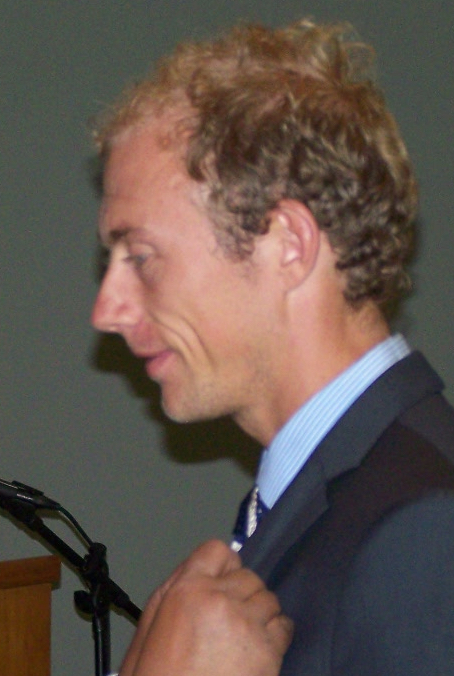
Tom Ashley

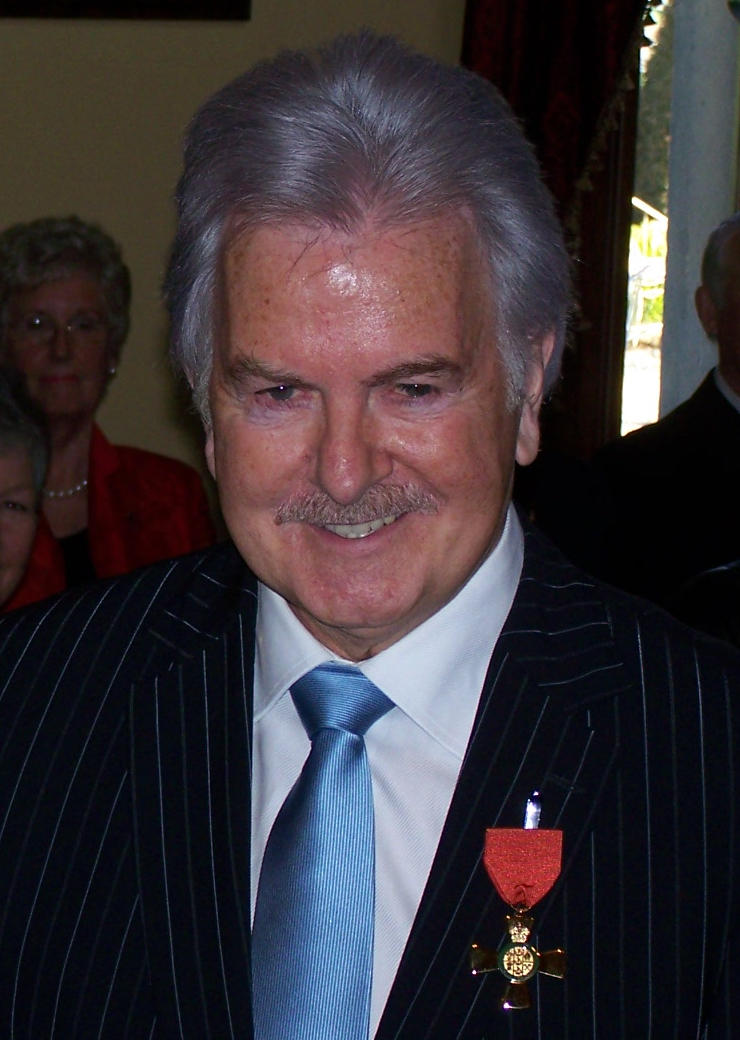
Neil Collins

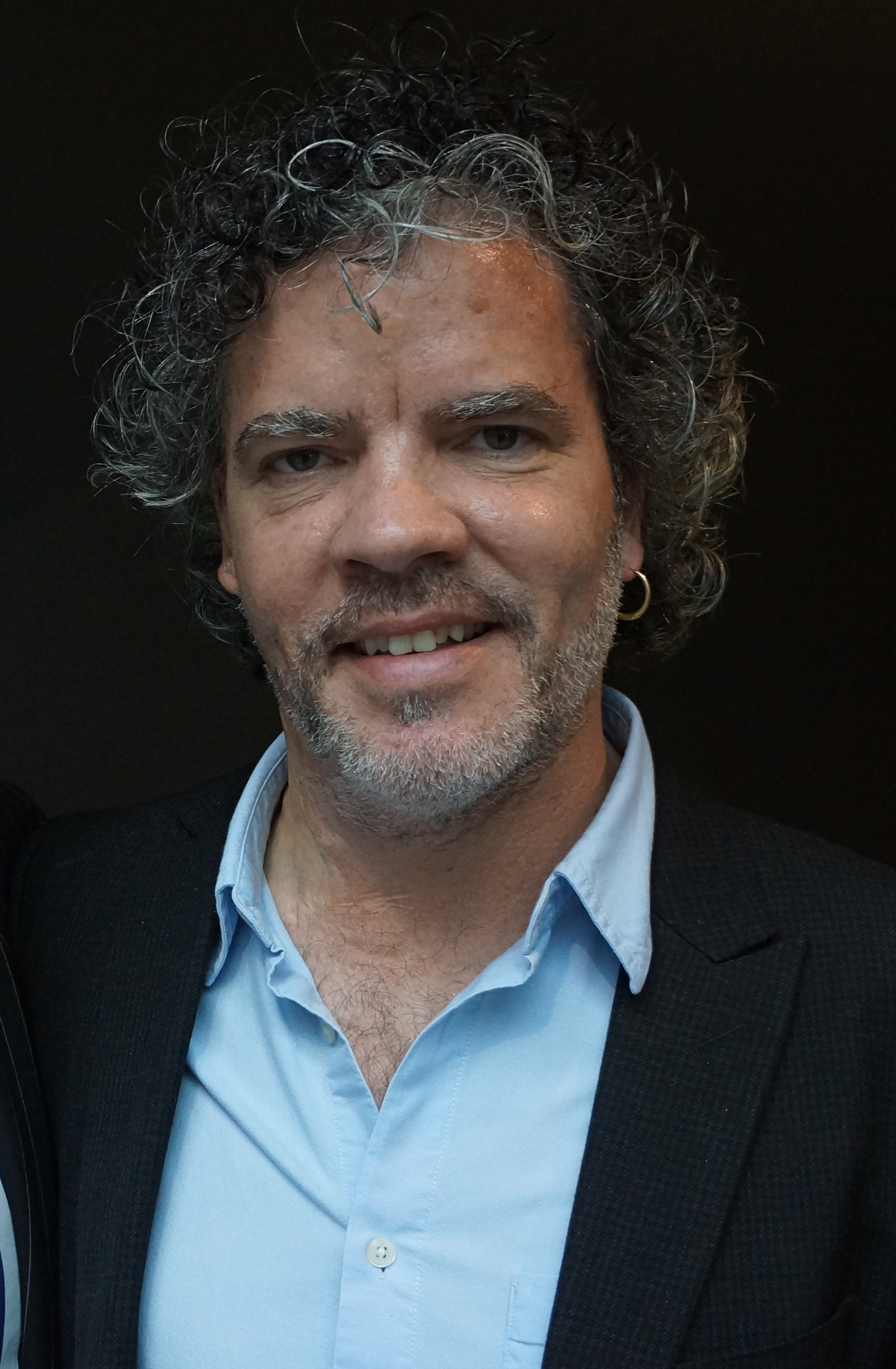
Peter Gordon

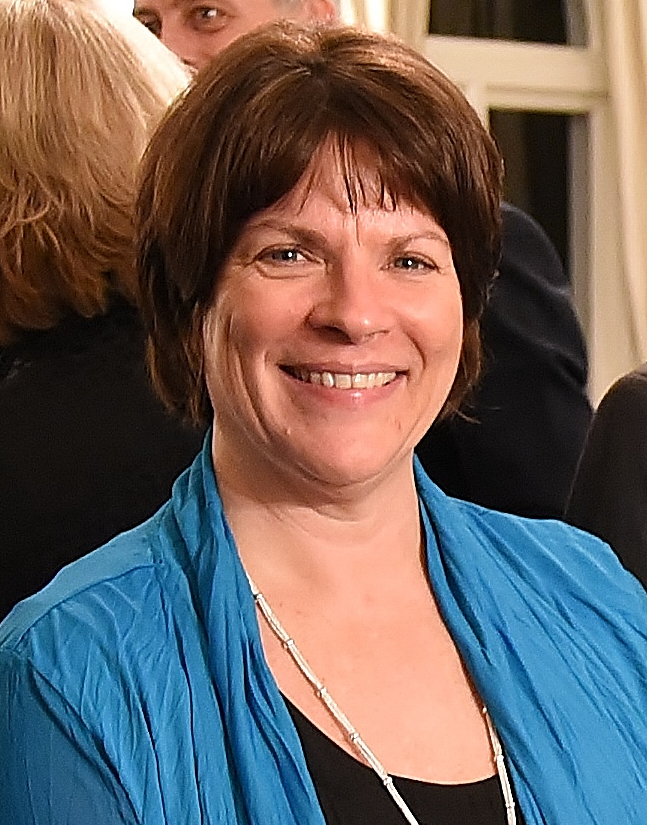
Harlene Hayne

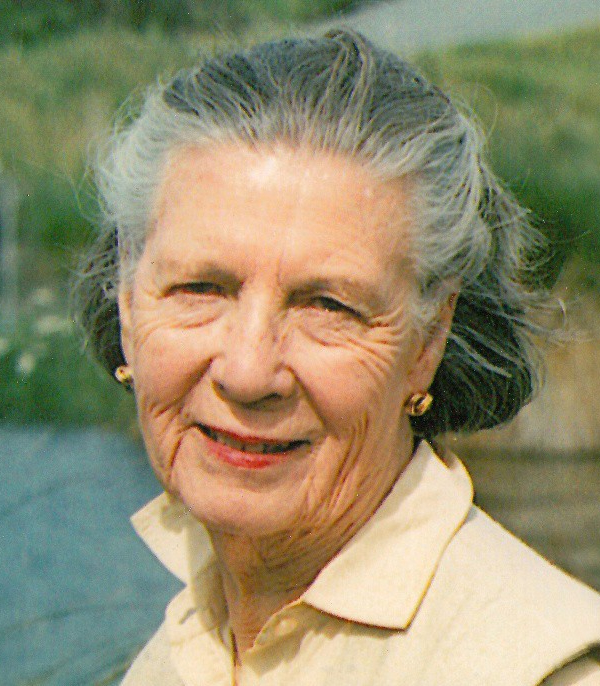
Diana, Lady Isaac

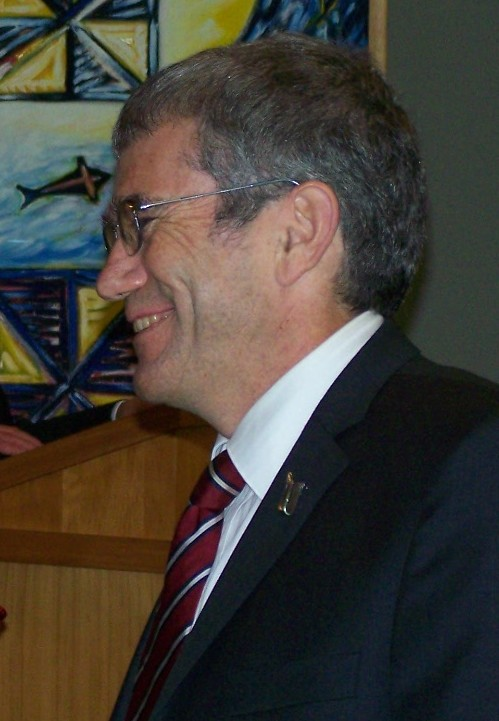
Alan Merry

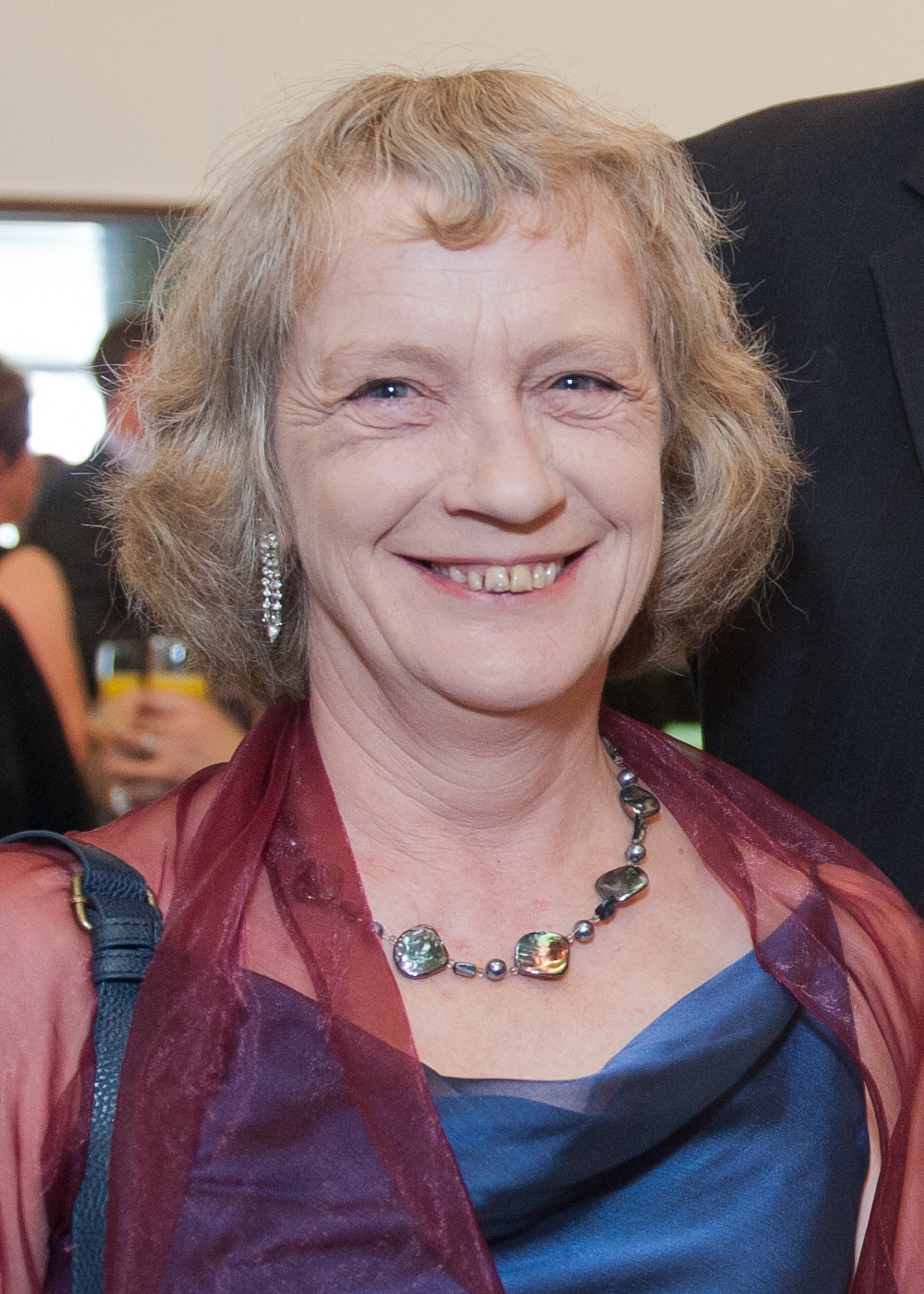
Caroline Saunders

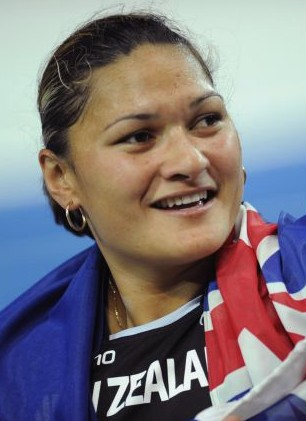
Valerie Vili

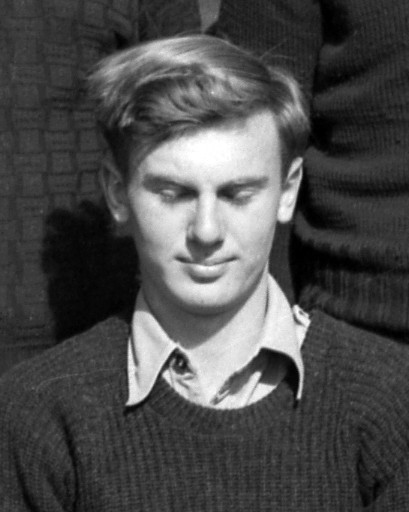
Robert Welch

=== Member (MNZM) ===
- Elizabeth Mavis Armstrong – of Wellington. For services to early childhood education.
- Robin Henry Eden Beckett – of Auckland. For services to the design industry.
- Albert Lloyd Beech – of Napier. For services to the environment and the community.
- George Spencer Bridgewater – of Oxford, United Kingdom. For services to rowing.
- Gregory Alexander (Elgregoe) Britt – of Christchurch. For services to education.
- Toesulu Maea Brown – of Auckland. For services to the Pacific Islands community.
- Jan Christine Coll JP – of Westport. For services to the community.
- John Michael Cronin JP – of Tauranga. For services to local-body affairs and the community.
- Dr Jeanette Rosemary Crossley – of Auckland. For services to science, in particular Addison's Disease.
- Colyn Kathleen Devereux-Kay – of Auckland. For services to business.
- Scott Ronald Dixon – of Indianapolis, Indiana, USA. For services to motorsport.
- Susan Jane Driver – of Wellington. For services to the community.
- Alexander Mahé Owens Drysdale – of Cambridge. For services to rowing.
- Brett Alexander England – of North Shore; superintendent, New Zealand Police. For services to the New Zealand Police.
- Amosa Fa'afoi – of Christchurch. For services to the Pacific Islands community.
- Christine Ellen Henderson – of Lumsden. For services to conservation.
- Graeme John Horsley – of Mount Maunganui South. For services to the valuation profession.
- Oscar Kightley – of Taupō. For services to television and the theatre.
- Associate Professor Michele Joy Leggott – of North Shore. For services to poetry.
- Cameron Leslie – of Waiwera. For services to swimming.
- Heather Lynette Thelma Maloney JP – of Pukekohe. For services to the community.
- Dr Diane Lysette Mara – of Napier. For services to the Pacific Islands community.
- Commissioner Garth Hugh McKenzie – of Wellington. For services to The Salvation Army.
- Peter Minturn – of Auckland. For services to jewellery manufacturing.
- Dr Johan Hendrik Morreau – of Rotorua. For services to community health.
- Thomas Eruera Whanaupani Mulligan – of Hastings. For services to Māori.
- Wendy Grace Neilson JP – of Tauranga. For services to people with disabilities.
- Sophie Frances Pascoe – of Christchurch. For services to swimming.
- David John Murray Peart JP – of Hamilton. For services to local-body affairs and the community.
- John Reuelu Penisula – of Invercargill. For services to art, in particular sculpture.
- Nicholas Graeme Perry – of London, England; detective superintendent, New Zealand Police. For services to the New Zealand Police.
- Hugh Charles Llewellyn Price – of Wellington. For services to publishing.
- Dr Lesley Claire Rothwell – of Wellington. For services to medicine.
- Hayden Roulston – of Ashburton. For services to cycling.
- Nola Leith Stuart JP – of Riverton. For services to the community.
- Julie Ann Stufkens – of Christchurch. For services to dietetics and paediatric nutrition.
- Professor Janis Elizabeth Swan – of Hamilton. For services to engineering.
- Paula Margaret Tesoriero – of Wellington. For services to cycling.
- Lois Myra Thompson – of Wellington. For services to education.
- Evelyn Maria Tobin JP – of Waitakere. For services to te reo.
- Anihira Te Waihanea Turoa-Henry JP – of Taumarunui. For services to Māori.
- Robert Nathan Twaddle – of Cambridge. For services to rowing.
- Garry Ralph Ward – of Waikanae. For services to broadcasting.
- Mabel Wharekawa-Burt JP – of Katikati. For services to the performing arts and the community.
- Nicholas Ian Willis – of Lower Hutt. For services to athletics.
- Stephen Ernest Wilson – of Christchurch. For services to business.
- Elizabeth Wood – of Lower Hutt. For services to children and young people.
- Professor Georgina Elsie Zellan-Smith – of Red Beach. For services to music.
- Warrant Officer Class One David Leslie Armstrong – Royal New Zealand Army Medical Corps (Territorial Force).

Additional

- Colonel Brendon Lee Fraher – Colonels' list, New Zealand Army.

Honorary

- Pier Luigi Loro Piana – of Vercelli, Italy. For services to the New Zealand merino trade.
- Kenji Nishi – of Beppu, Ōita, Japan. For services to New Zealand–Japan relations.
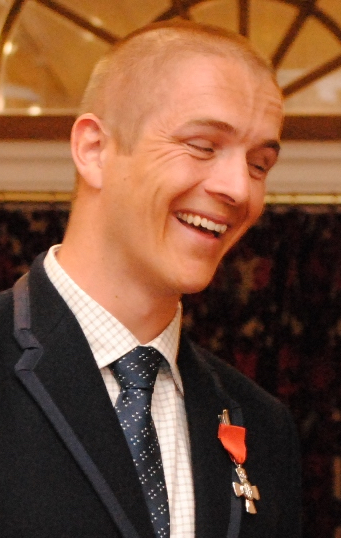
George Bridgewater

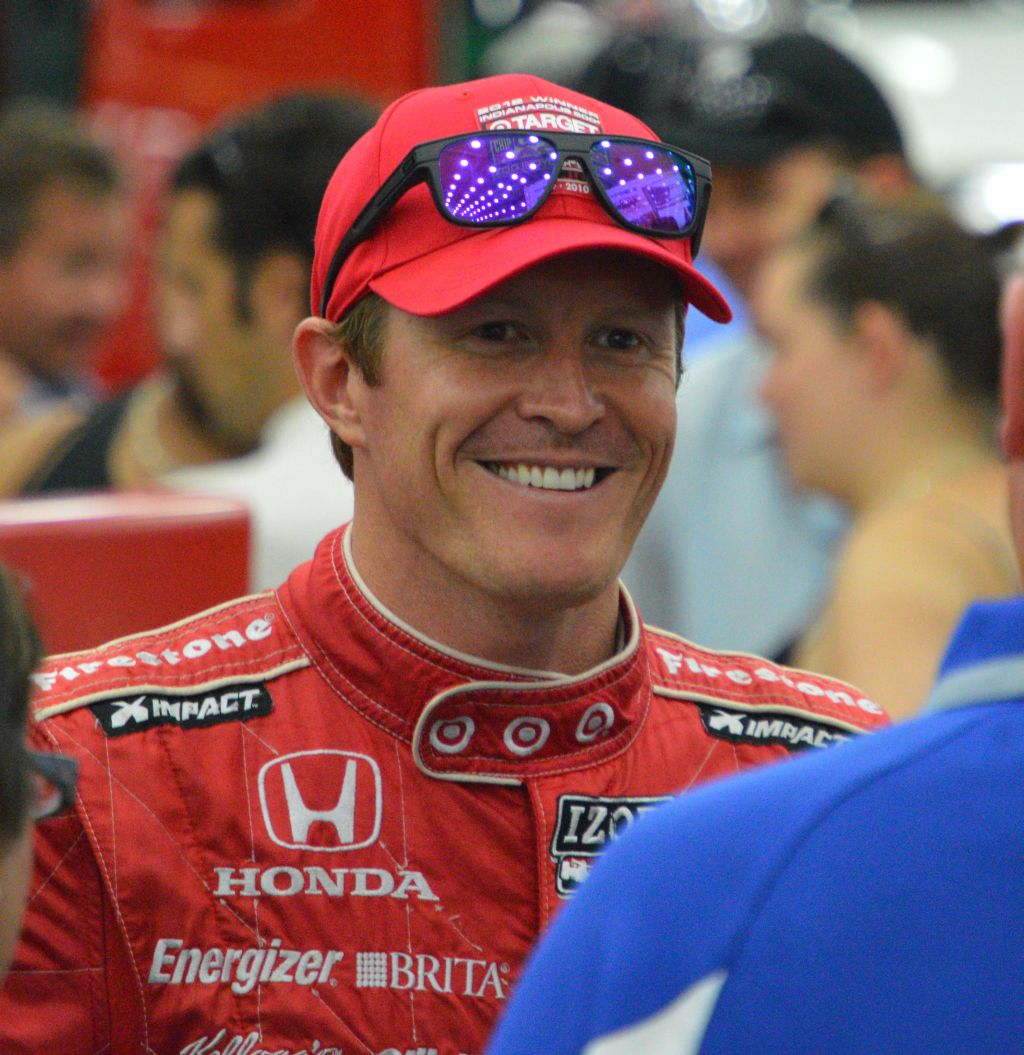
Scott Dixon

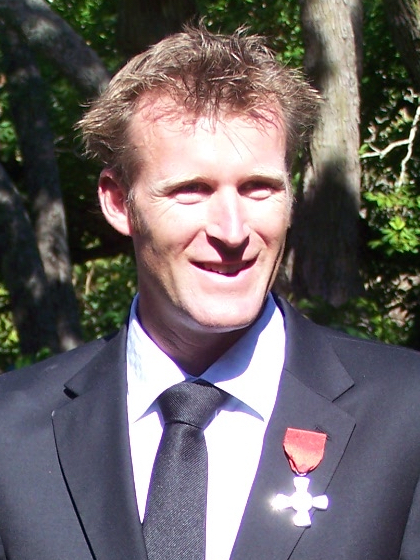
Mahé Drysdale

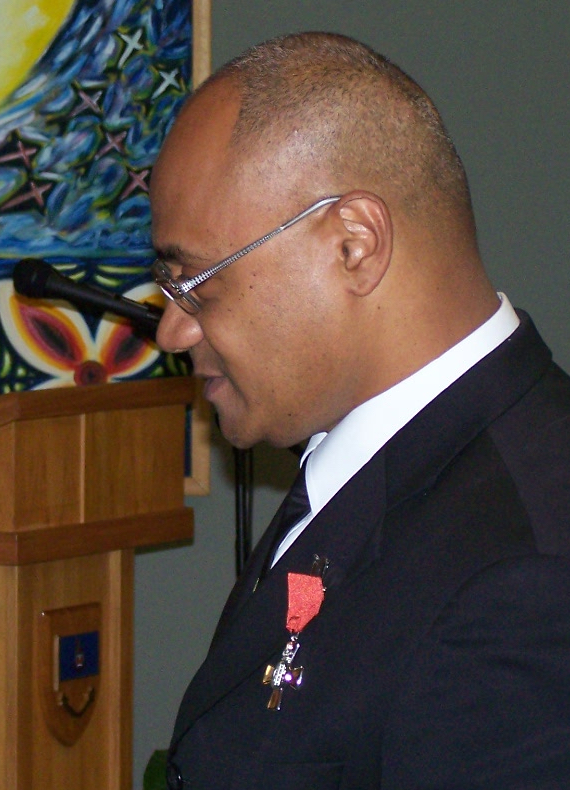
Oscar Kightley

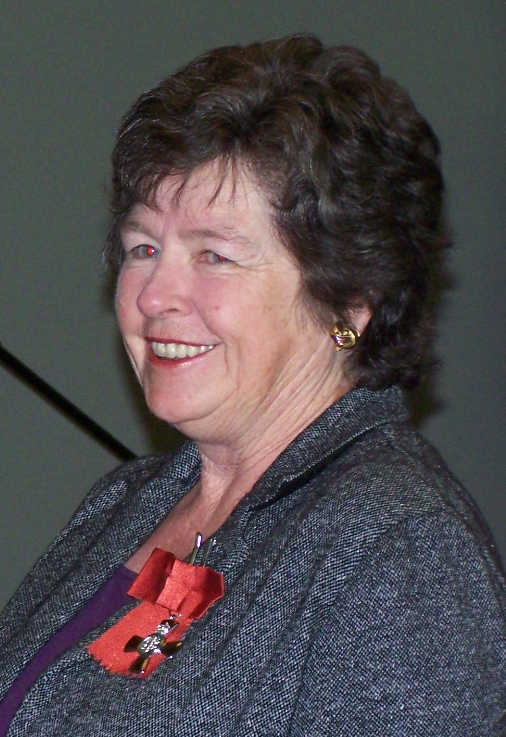
Heather Maloney

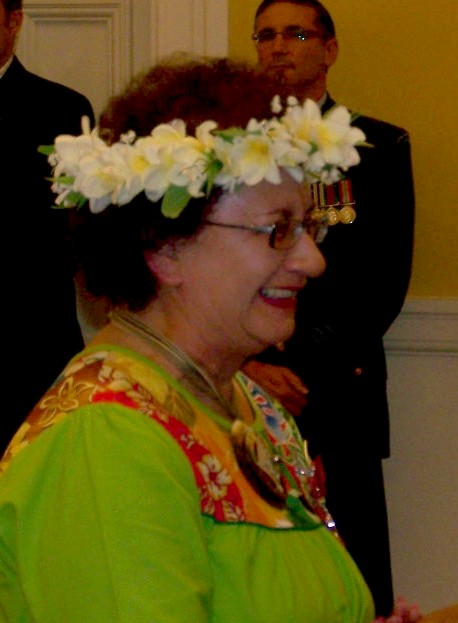
Diane Mara

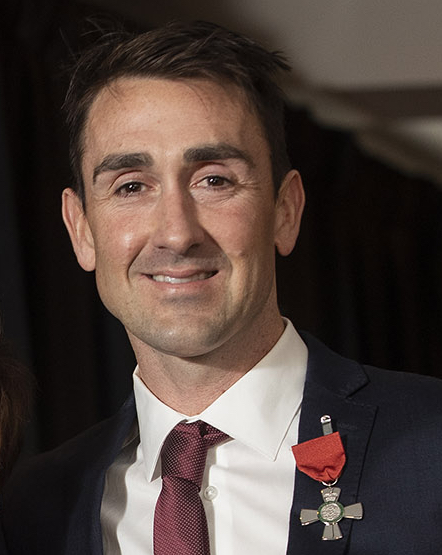
Hayden Roulston

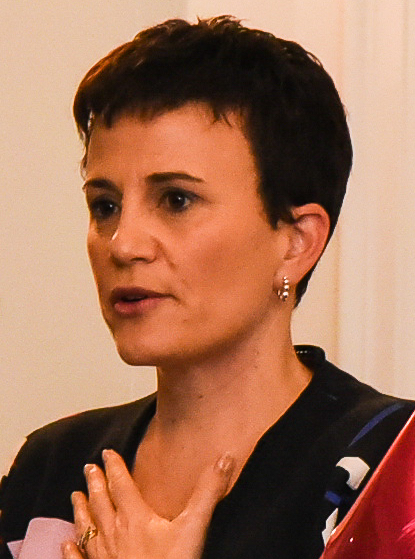
Paula Tesoriero

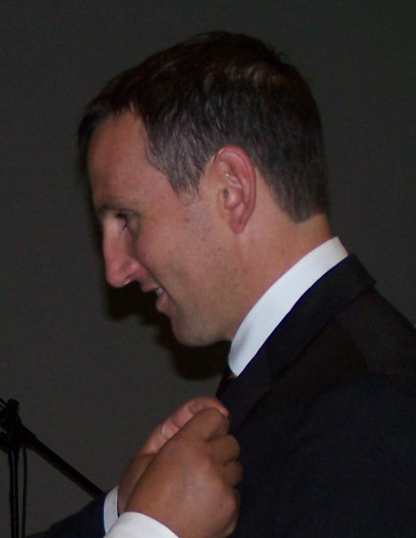
Nathan Twaddle

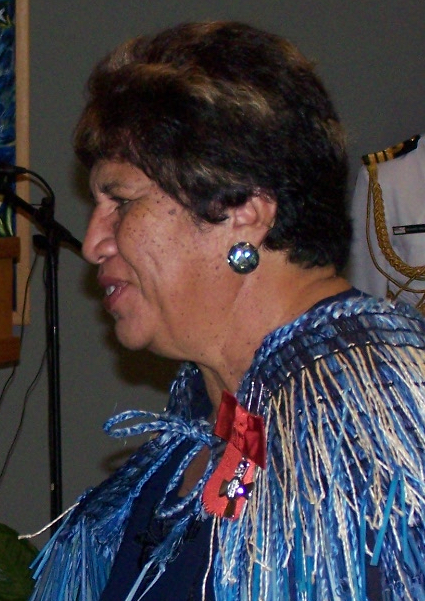
Mabel Wharekawa-Burt

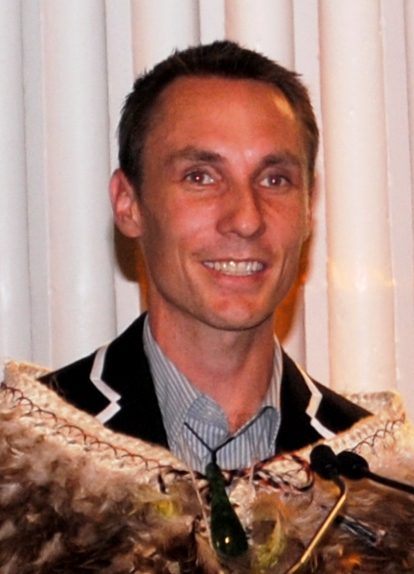
Nick Willis

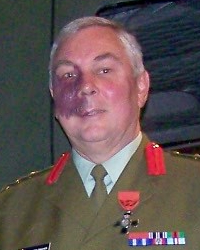
Brendon Fraher

== Companion of the Queen's Service Order (QSO) ==
- Jennifer Marion Broom – of Auckland. For services to the refugee community.
- Thomas Edward (Ward) Clarke – of Christchurch. For services to education.
- Jessie Muriel Mary Gunn MBE – of Wellington. For services to veterans' affairs.
- Barbara Holland – of Greymouth. For services to health.
- Murray Roger Hosking – of Lower Hutt. For services to conservation.
- Professor Philippa Lynne Howden-Chapman – of Wellington. For services to public health.
- Elspeth Cantlie Kennedy MBE – of Nelson. For services to the community.
- Gavin Alistair McFadyen – of Wellington; lately assistant commissioner, New Zealand Police. For services to the New Zealand Police.
- Kay Therese McKelvie – of Auckland. For services to business and health.
- Gwendolyn Anne Nagel – of Kaukapakapa. For services to special education.
- The Honourable Clement Rudolph Simich – of Auckland. For services as a member of parliament.
- The Honourable Paul Desmond Swain – of Upper Hutt. For services as a member of parliament.
- Lester Gordon Taylor JP – of Lower Hutt. For services to education.
- Major Hone Hikitia Te Rangi Waititi (retired) JP – of Ōpōtiki. For services to the community.
- The Reverend Charles Tansey Waldegrave – of Lower Hutt. For services to social policy.
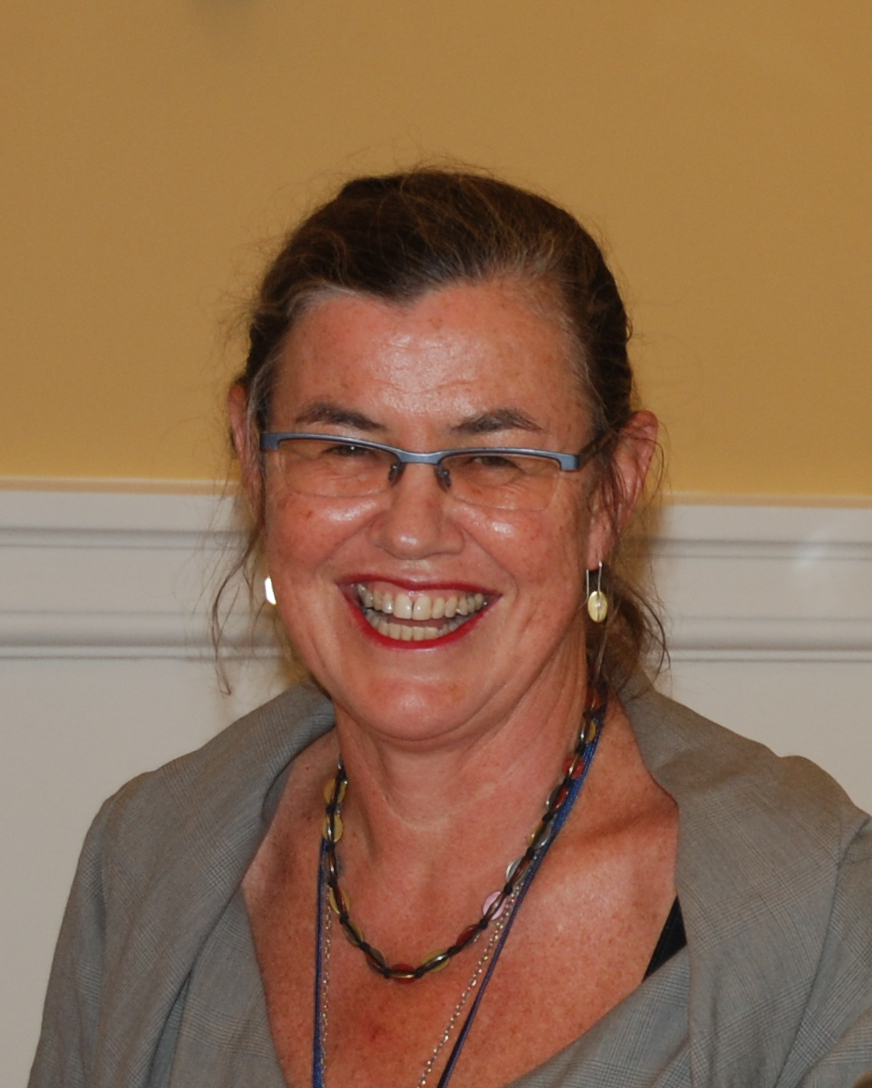
Philippa Howden-Chapman

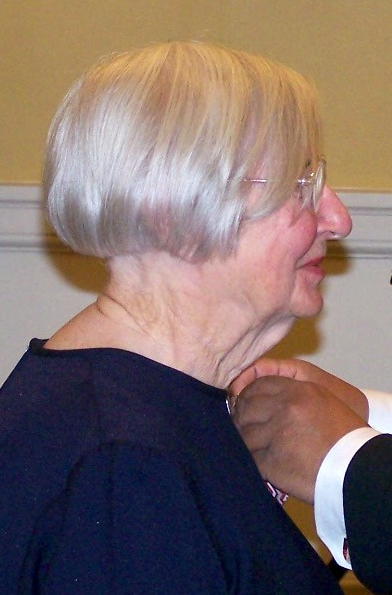
Elspeth Kennedy

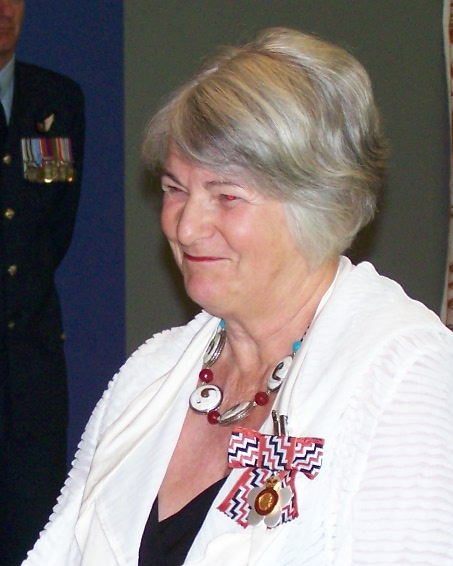
Kay McKelvie

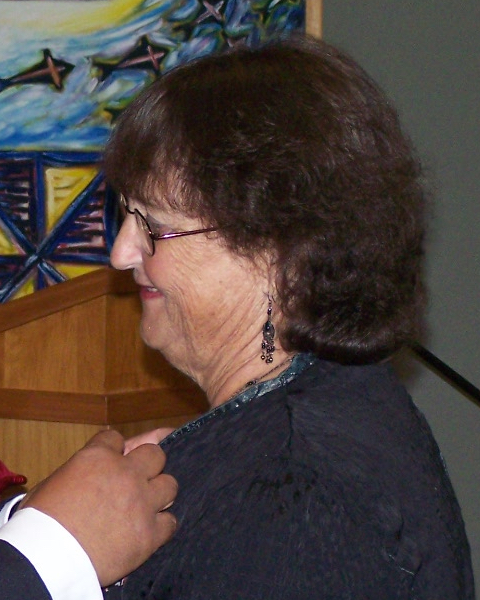
Gwen Nagel

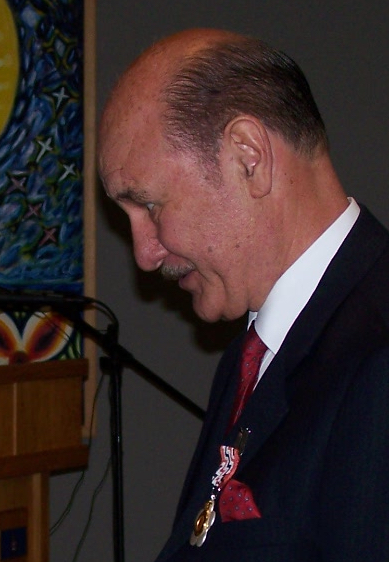
Clem Simich

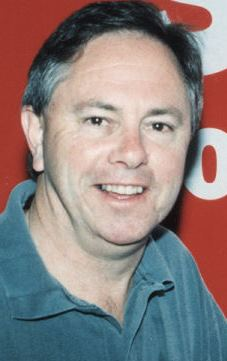
Paul Swain

== Queen's Service Medal (QSM) ==
- Teina Akavi – of Waitakere. For services to the Cook Islands community.
- Allan Royce Anderson JP – of Wanganui. For services to conservation and the community.
- Christine Ann Anderson – of Ōtaki. For services to the community.
- Stephen William Baggs – of Waitakere. For services to the New Zealand Customs Service.
- Wikitoria Suvia Baker – of Temuka. For services to Māori, music and the community.
- Robert Ames Bettison – of Waiuku. For services to the community.
- Jeanette Lesley Blackadder JP – of Christchurch. For services to country music.
- Donald Gilmour Brash – of Ōakura. For services to the community.
- Ereti Taetuha Brown – of Waitakere. For services to Māori and youth.
- Judith Anne Bruce – of Christchurch. For services to the community.
- Squadron Leader Wayne Leslie Buckingham – of Paekākāriki; New Zealand Cadet Forces. For services to the New Zealand Cadet Forces.
- Laurel Beatrice Burdett ED – of Taupō. For services to the community.
- Monica Teresa Burns – of Invercargill. For services to netball.
- Mary Elizabeth Busch JP – of Wellington. For services to education and the community.
- Dr Eleanor Margaret Carmichael – of Hamilton. For services to the community.
- Dennis Paul Clarke – of New Plymouth. For services to the community.
- Joseph Cochrane – of Upper Hutt. For services to the community.
- Glenn William Cockburn – of Rolleston; chief fire officer, Rolleston Volunteer Fire Brigade, New Zealand Fire Service. For services to the New Zealand Fire Service.
- The Reverend David Allan Connor – of Auckland. For services to prisoner welfare.
- Ashley Ralph Day JP – of Dunedin. For services to education.
- Irwin Lloyd Esler – of Invercargill. For services to the community.
- Dr Michael John Seaborn Floate – of Cromwell. For services to conservation and mountaineering.
- Patricia Ellen Flynn – of Featherston. For services to the community.
- Robin John Frederick Frahm JP – of Oxford. For services to the community.
- Gina Garcia – of Kerikeri. For services to music.
- Professor Russell Garcia – of Kerikeri. For services to music.
- Kalwant Singh Gill – of Palmerston North. For services to ethnic communities.
- Benjamin Wallace Goddard – of Ohakune; chief fire officer, Ohakune Volunteer Fire Brigade, New Zealand Fire Service. For services to the New Zealand Fire Service.
- Bruce Leonard Good – of Auckland; detective inspector, New Zealand Police. For services to the New Zealand Police.
- Bridget Margaret Graham – of Auckland. For services to the community.
- Anthony James Haggerty JP – of Waitakere. For services to the New Zealand Fire Service.
- Malia Toa Filimoe'unga Hamani – of Auckland. For services to the Pacific Islands community and senior citizens.
- Frederick Robert Hamer – of Wellington. For services to the railways.
- Dr Brahmavar Ramanna Sadananda Hegde – of Lower Hutt. For services to community medicine.
- Athol John Herbert JP – of Papamoa. For services to the community.
- Susan Sui Wei Hou – of Dunedin. For services to the Chinese community.
- The Reverend Dorothy Howard – of Lower Hutt. For services to the community.
- Marie Elizabeth May Hull-Brown – of North Shore. For services to the Mental Health Foundation.
- James Brian Hulton – of Kaiapoi. For services to soccer.
- Noel Alfred Jones – of Whakatāne. For services to sport.
- Brian Desmond Joyce JP – of Papakura. For services to Māori and the community.
- Dr Frank Yet Keong Liaw – of Tūrangi. For services to community medicine and the community.
- Heather Elizabeth Lindauer JP – of Russell. For services to the community.
- Thangaratnam Mahasivam – of Auckland. For services to the Tamil community.
- Lindsay Mitchell Malcolm – of Oamaru. For services to the community.
- Anna Marshall – of Whangārei. For services to the Pacific Islands community and the community.
- Pamela Yvonne Marama Marshall JP – of Palmerston North. For services to the community.
- The Reverend Albert Martin – of New Plymouth. For services to Māori.
- Lyneve Constance Maxwell – of Paeroa. For services to music.
- Gordon Douglas McDowell – of Taupō. For services to returned services personnel.
- Samuel Peter Moeke – of Hastings. For services to Māori.
- Kevin Ronald Moseley – of Blenheim. For services to brass bands.
- Janet Patricia Paku – of Napier. For services to the Department of Corrections.
- Nellie Waimatatini Paratene – of Masterton. For services to the community.
- Dr Kantilal Naranji Patel – of Manukau. For services to community medicine and the Indian community.
- Ranjna Patel JP – of Manukau. For services to the Indian community.
- Lynne Renwick – of Te Aroha. For services to theatre and youth.
- Fraser Bell Ross – of Timaru. For services to conservation.
- Ernest Thomas Rouse – of Napier. For services to entertainment.
- John Richard Edward Ryan JP – of Cambridge. For services to Māori and the community.
- Taime Pareanga Samuel – of Hastings. For services to the Pacific Islands community.
- Mary Ann Selwyn – of Manukau. For services to Māori and the community.
- Gary Ross Severinsen JP – of Napier. For services to the community.
- Granby Ray Siakimotu – of Manukau. For services to the Pacific Islands community.
- Maureen Smith – of Motueka. For services to the community.
- Dr Margaret Rose Southwick – of Porirua. For services to the Pacific Islands community.
- Kevin James Stewart – of Napier; sergeant, New Zealand Police. For services to the New Zealand Police.
- Homer Geoffrey Stubbs JP – of Waihi. For services to the community.
- Graeme Stuart Tait – of Huntly. For services to the community.
- Tupou Here Tamata-Manapori – of Manukau. For services to the Pacific Islands community.
- Archdeacon Richard Rangi Wallace – of Hokitika. For services to Māori.
- John Howard Ward BEM – of Porirua; constable, New Zealand Police. For services to the New Zealand Police.
- Rodney Dean Waterhouse – of Te Puke; senior firefighter, Maketu Volunteer Fire Brigade, New Zealand Fire Service. For services to the New Zealand Fire Service.
- Kenneth Ivan Williamson JP – of Hamilton. For services to the community.
- Gerald Joe Wong – of Palmerston North. For services to the Chinese community.
- Mary Woods – of Christchurch. For services to volunteering.
- Susan Valerie Wright – of Coromandel. For services to the community.
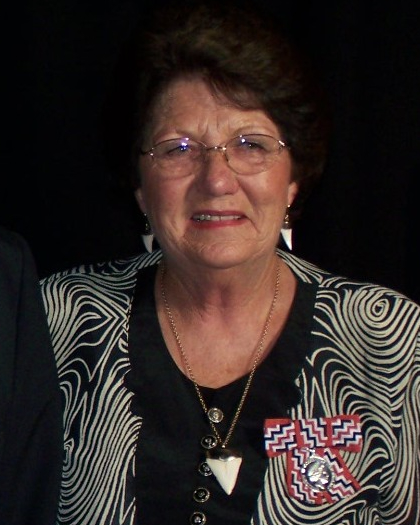
Wiki Baker

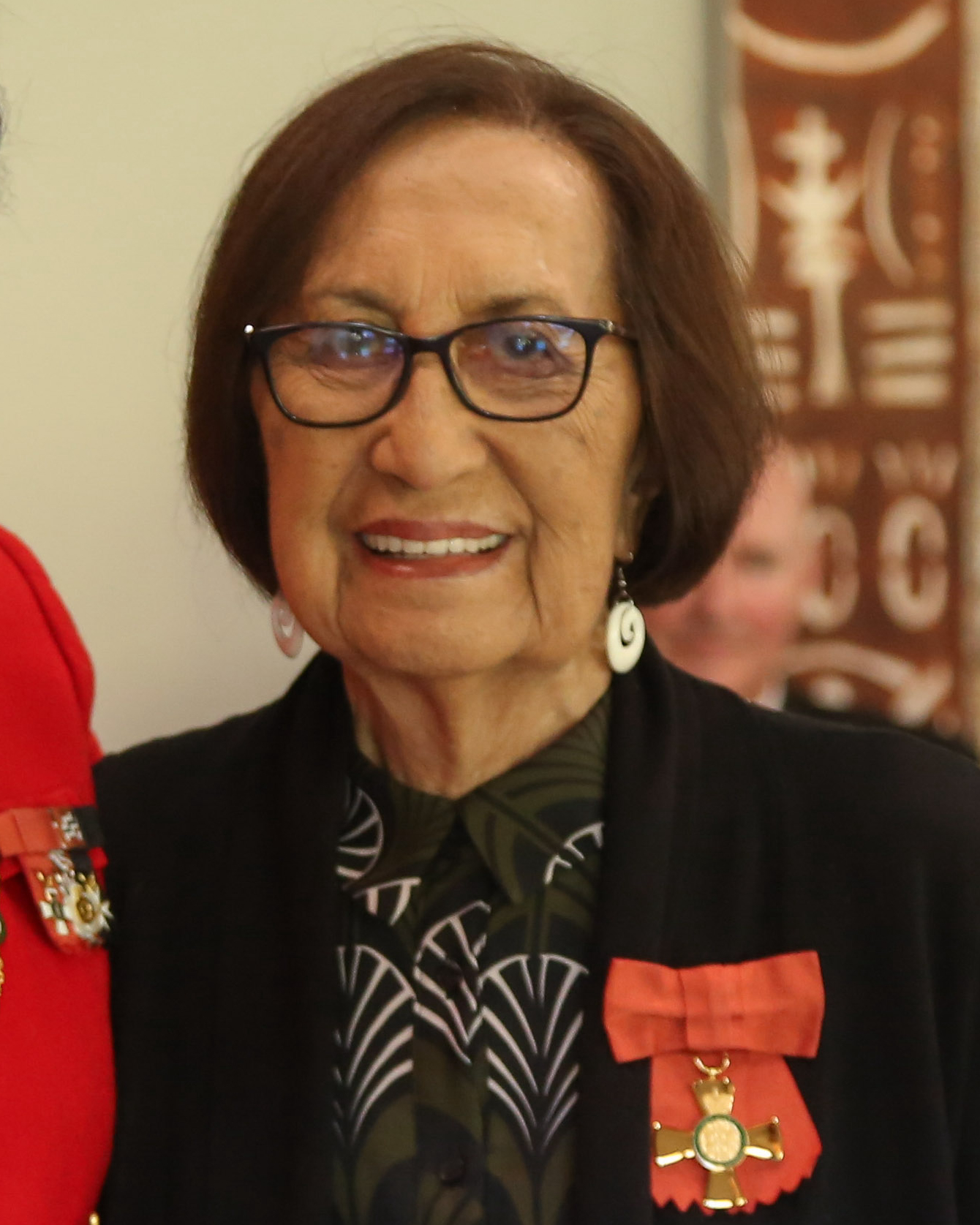
Letty Brown

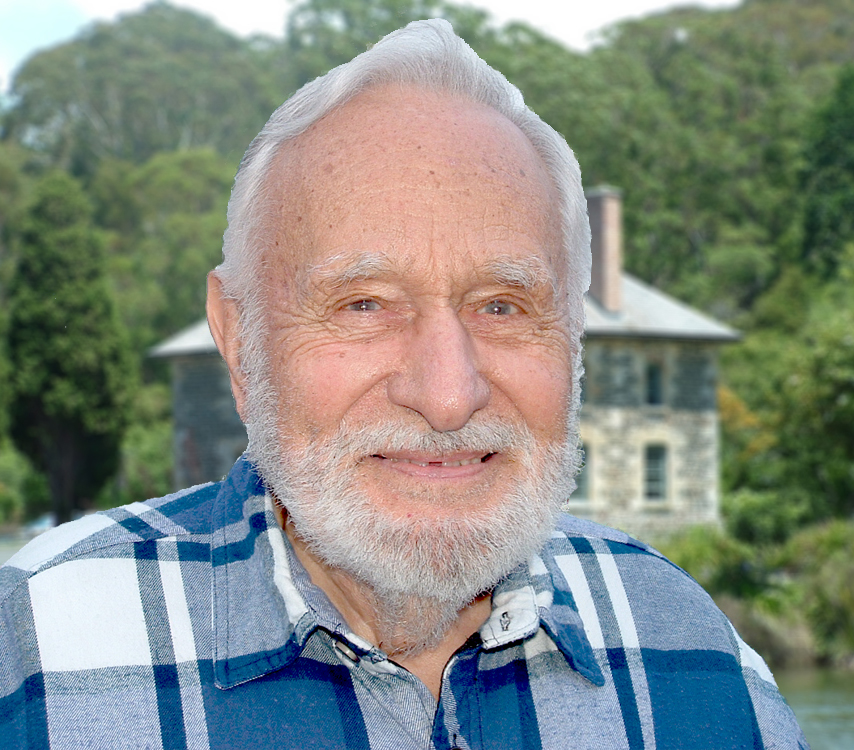
Russell Garcia

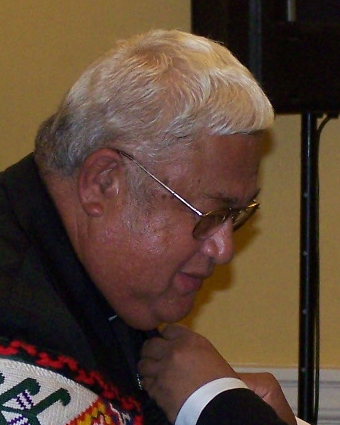
Albie Martin

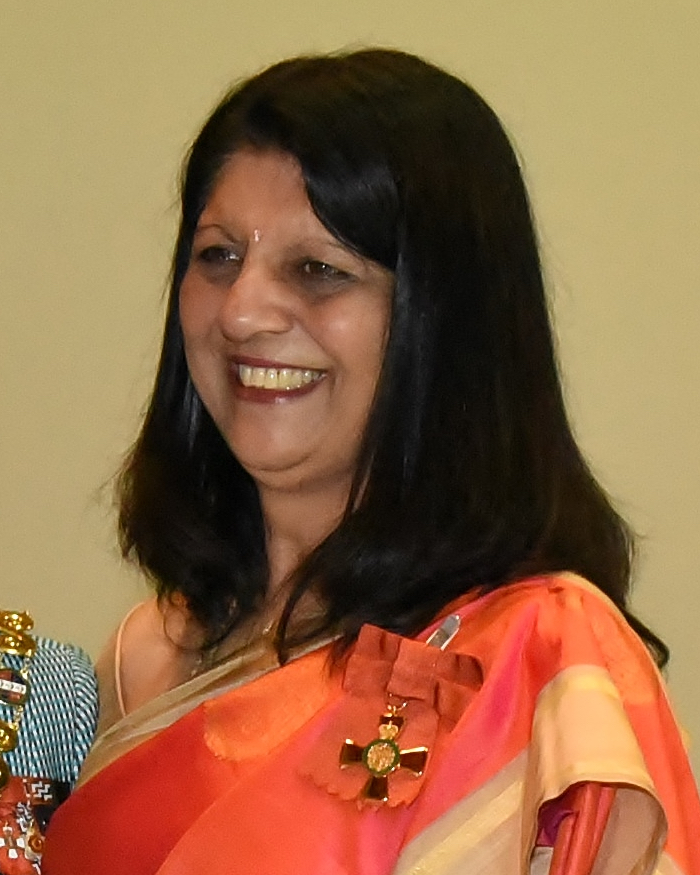
Ranjna Patel

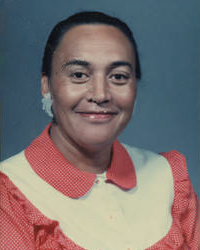
Tupou Tamata‑Manapori

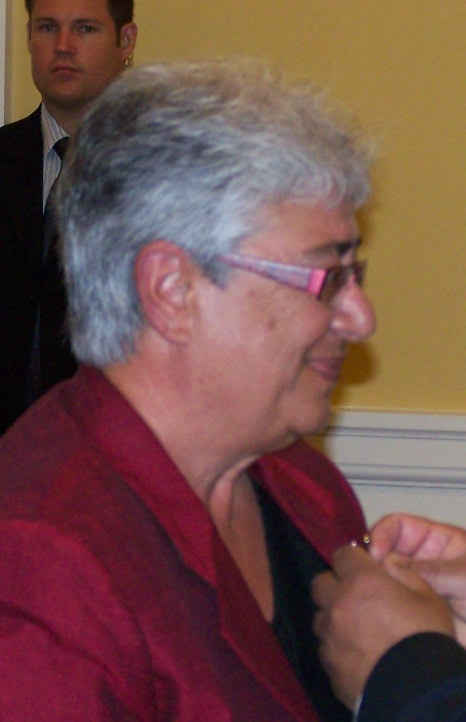
Margaret Southwick

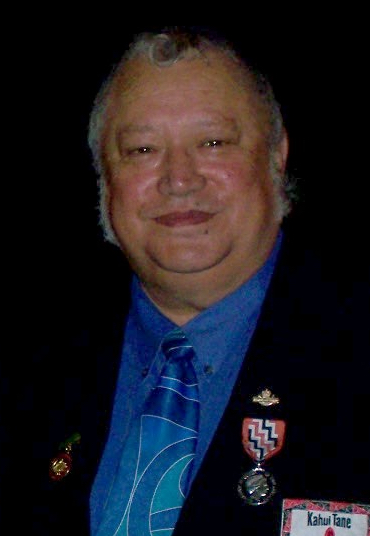
Richard Wallace

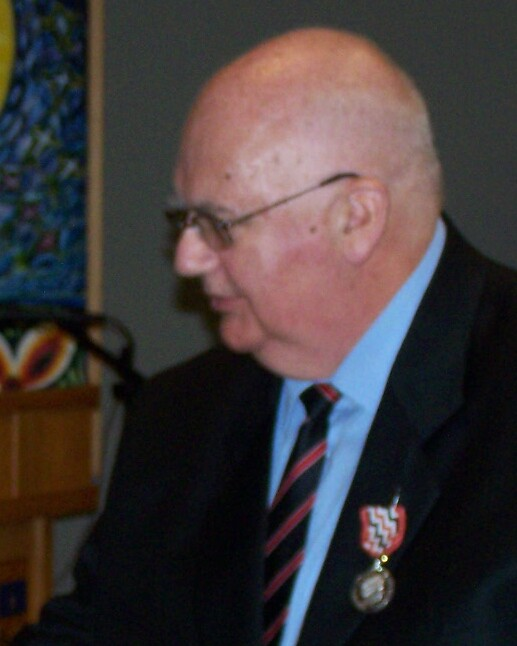
Kenneth Williamson

== Distinguished Service Decoration (DSD) ==
- Gunner Phillip John Manning – Royal Regiment of New Zealand Artillery.
- Warrant Officer Stores Accountant Neil Andrew Roberts – Royal New Zealand Navy.
- Colonel George Sean Trengrove MVO – Colonels' list, New Zealand Army (Territorial Force).
- Warrant Officer Class Two John Francis Weel – Royal Regiment of New Zealand Artillery.
