= Ayyoob Sharifi =

Japanese academic

- Born: Iran
- Citizenship: Japanese
- Education: University of Tabriz; Iran University of Science and Technology; Nagoya University
- Known for: Research on urban sustainability, urban resilience, smart cities, and climate change
- Scientific career
- Fields: Urban Science, Environmental Science, Sustainability
- Workplaces: Hiroshima University

Ayyoob Sharifi is an Iranian-born Japanese academic and urban scientist. He is a professor at Hiroshima University, where he leads the Urban Environmental Science (URBES) laboratory. His research focuses on urban sustainability, resilience, and climate change adaptation and mitigation

== Education ==
Sharifi completed his undergraduate studies in civil engineering at the University of Tabriz in 2005. He then pursued a Master of Science in Urban and Regional Planning and received his degree from Iran University of Science and Technology in 2008. In 2010, he was awarded the Japanese Government Scholarship (MEXT) for a doctoral course at the Department of Environmental Engineering and Architecture, Nagoya University. His doctoral research focused on neighborhood sustainability assessment. In 2013, he was awarded a Doctor of Engineering degree and a postgraduate certificate in integrated environmental studies.

== Career ==
Sharifi began his academic career in 2013 when he joined the National Institute for Environmental Studies as a research fellow. He was also the Executive Director of the Global Carbon Project-Tsukuba International Office, hosted by the institute.

In 2018, he joined Hiroshima University as an assistant professor, becoming an associate professor in 2020 and a full professor in 2022. At Hiroshima University, he has affiliations with multiple departments: Graduate School of Innovation and Practice for Smart Society, Graduate School of Humanities and Social Sciences, and Graduate School of Advanced Science and Engineering. He is also a core member of the Network for Education and Research for Peace and Sustainability (NERPS)

While at Hiroshima University, Sharifi has held cross-appointments and visiting/honorary professor positions at various institutions, including:The University of Queensland and Lebanese American University. He has also worked as a consultant for several organizations, such as the United Nations Human Settlements Programme (UN-Habitat).

Sharifi has authored more than 250 peer-reviewed journal articles and over 50 conference papers, books, and technical reports. He is actively involved with international programs such as Future Earth and has served as a lead author for the Sixth Assessment Report (AR6) of the Intergovernmental Panel on Climate Change (IPCC).

He serves as the Editor for the Journal of Environmental Management, Associate Editor for Urban Climate, and has editorial roles in several other specialized journals.

== Selected publications ==
- Sharifi, A. (2016). A critical review of selected tools for assessing community resilience. Ecological Indicators, 69, 629-647. doi:10.1016/j.ecolind.2016.05.023
- Sharifi, A. (2016). From Garden City to Eco-urbanism: The quest for sustainable neighborhood development. Sustainable Cities and Society, 20, 1-16. doi:10.1016/j.scs.2015.09.002
- Sharifi, A. (2019). Resilient urban forms: A macro-scale analysis. Cities, 85, 1-14. doi:10.1016/j.cities.2018.11.023
- Sharifi, A. (2019). Urban form resilience: A meso-scale analysis. Cities, 93, 238-252. doi:10.1016/j.cities.2019.05.010
- Sharifi, A. (2021). Co-benefits and synergies between urban climate change mitigation and adaptation measures: A literature review. Science of the Total Environment, 750, 141642. doi:10.1016/j.scitotenv.2020.141642
- Sharifi, A. (2023). Resilience of urban social-ecological-technological systems (SETS): A review. Sustainable Cities and Society, 99, 104910. doi:10.1016/j.scs.2023.104910
- Sharifi, A., & Khavarian-Garmsir, A. R. (2020). The COVID-19 pandemic: Impacts on cities and major lessons for urban planning, design, and management. Science of the Total Environment, 749, 142391. doi:10.1016/j.scitotenv.2020.142391
- Sharifi, A., Amirzadeh, M., & Khavarian-Garmsir, A. R. (2025). The metaverse as a future form of smart cities: A systematic literature review of co-benefits and trade-offs for sustainable development goals. Cities, 161, 105879. doi:10.1016/j.cities.2025.105879

== Awards and recognition ==
Sharifi is recognized as a Highly-cited Researcher according to Clarivate. He is also a recipient of Hiroshima University's Phoenix Outstanding Researcher Award
