= Caroline Saunders =

New Zealand economist and researcher

Caroline Saunders ONZM
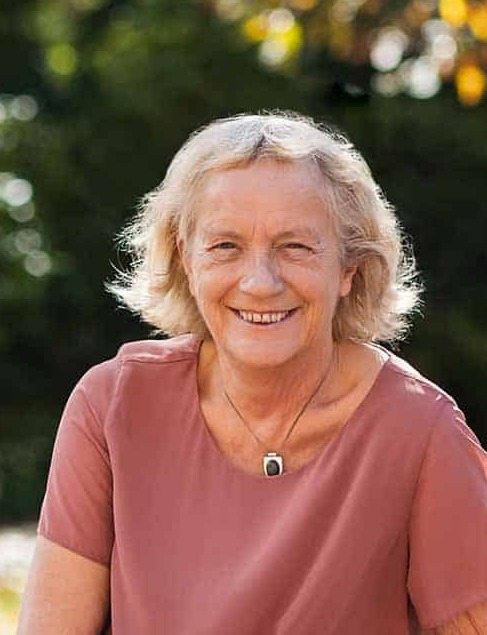
- Saunders in 2023
- Born: Caroline Mary Saunders
- Education: Newcastle University
- Scientific career
- Fields: Environmental economics
- Workplaces: Newcastle University; Lincoln University
- Thesis: Intra-EC agricultural trade with special reference to wheat (1984)
- Doctoral students: Anita Wreford

Caroline Mary Saunders ONZM is a New Zealand academic, and as of 2020 is a distinguished professor at Lincoln University, specialising in environmental economics. She is a Fellow of the Royal Society Te Apārangi.

== Academic career ==
After a BSc (Hons) degree at the University College of North Wales (now Bangor University), Saunders completed a PhD titled Intra-EC agricultural trade with special reference to wheat at Newcastle University in 1984. Saunders was then appointed as a lecturer at Newcastle, before moving in 1996 to Lincoln University as a senior lecturer. Saunders was appointed as a distinguished professor in November 2020, one of only four at Lincoln University. She is professor of international trade and the environment and is director of the Agribusiness and Economics Research Unit.

Saunders's research focuses on environmental economics and trade. She is particularly known for her work on food miles, showing that New Zealand dairy products, lamb and apples in the British marketplace do not have a higher environmental impact than local products. Saunders has worked for the EU Commission, FAO, MFAT, the New Zealand Treasury, OECD and Fonterra, among others. She was also appointed as a member of the Reserve Bank's Monetary Policy Committee, and is a director of Landcare Research.

Notable doctoral students of Saunders include Anita Wreford.

== Honours and awards ==
In 2007, Saunders was the NZIER Economist of the Year. She was appointed an Officer of the New Zealand Order of Merit, for services to agricultural research, in the 2009 New Year Honours.

Saunders was selected as one of the Royal Society Te Apārangi's 150 women in 150 words in 2017. She was on the council of the Royal Society Te Apārangi from 2015 to 2018. In 2019, the Agricultural Economics Society in the United Kingdom appointed Saunders as its president, a role that she was still filling in a caretaker capacity as of 2021.

In March 2021, Saunders was made a Fellow of the Royal Society Te Apārangi, in recognition of her "outstanding contributions to the advancement of science by creating new knowledge in her research field of agriculture and economics".

== Selected works ==
- Peter Tait; Saunders, Caroline Mary; Nugent, Graham; Paul Rutherford (2016). "Valuing conservation benefits of disease control in wildlife: A choice experiment approach to bovine tuberculosis management in New Zealand's native forests". Journal of Environmental Management. 189: 142–149. doi:10.1016/j.jenvman.2016.12.045. PMID 28012389. Wikidata Q36232745.
- Peter Tait; Paul Rutherford; Saunders, Caroline Mary (2013). "Do consumers of manufactured cigarettes respond differently to price changes compared with their Roll-Your-Own counterparts? Evidence from New Zealand". Tobacco Control. 24 (3): 285–289. doi:10.1136/tobaccocontrol-2013-051010. PMID 24259046. Wikidata Q50140520.
- Bateman, Ian; Brouwer, Roy; Stavros Georgiou; Hanley, Nick; Machado, Fernando; Susana Mourato; Saunders, Caroline Mary (2005). "A 'Natural Experiment' Approach to Contingent Valuation of Private and Public UV Health Risk Reduction Strategies in Low and High Risk Countries". Environmental and Resource Economics. 31 (1): 47–72. doi:10.1007/s10640-004-6978-7. Wikidata Q57922511.
- Saunders, Caroline Mary; Wreford, Anita; Selim Cagatay (2006). "Trade liberalisation and greenhouse gas emissions: the case of dairying in the European Union and New Zealand". Australian Journal of Agricultural and Resource Economics. 50 (4): 538–555. doi:10.1111/j.1467-8489.2006.00343.x. Wikidata Q58112249.
- Dalziel, Paul Charles; Saunders, Caroline Mary; Peter Tait; John Saunders; Sini Miller; Meike Guenther; Paul Rutherford; Tim Driver (2018). "Rewarding responsible innovation when consumers are distant from producers: evidence from New Zealand". International Food and Agribusiness Management Review. 21 (4): 487–504. doi:10.22434/ifamr2017.0012. Wikidata Q59225417.
- Dalziel, Paul Charles; Saunders, Caroline Mary (2016). "Treasury's refreshed views on New Zealand's economic strategy: a review article". New Zealand Economic Papers. 52 (1): 91–107. doi:10.1080/00779954.2016.1268196. Wikidata Q59225421.
- Dalziel, Paul Charles; Saunders, Caroline Mary (2007). "Community initiatives for environment-based economic development in a depressed region: a case study from the West Coast of New Zealand". International Journal of Business and Globalisation. 1 (3): 391. doi:10.1504/ijbg.2007.015056. Wikidata Q59225484.
