= Dave Currie =

New Zealand sports administrator

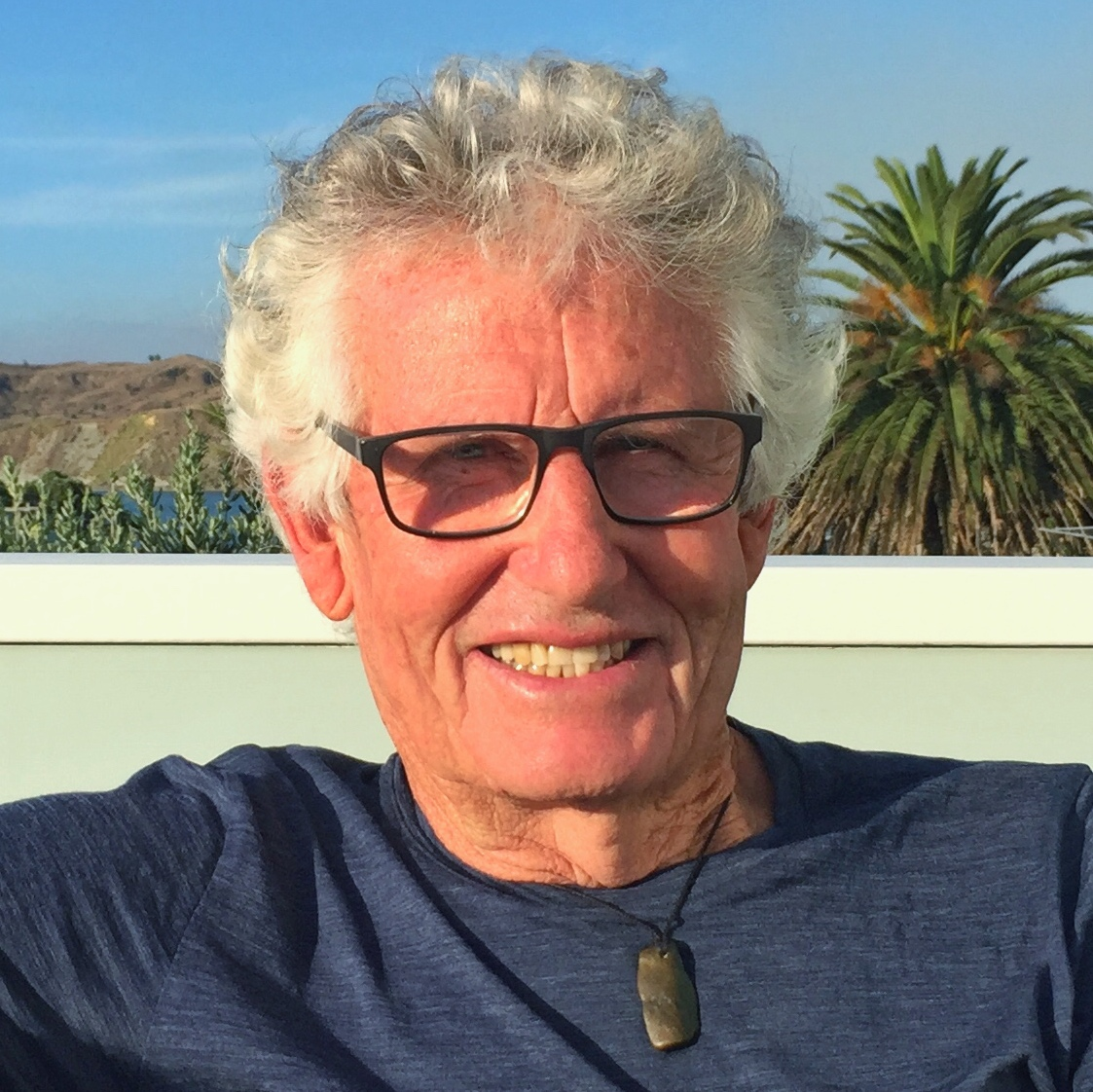
Dave Currie in Raglan, March 2020

David Findlay Currie CNZM (born 1945) is a New Zealand sports administrator who has been the chef de mission at many international sports events. In the 2009 New Year Honours, Currie was appointed a Companion of the New Zealand Order of Merit for services to sports administration.

== Career ==
Currie has held the following chef de mission posts, mainly for the New Zealand Olympic Committee:

- 2000 Paralympics (Sydney)
- 2002 Commonwealth Games (Manchester)
- 2004 Summer Olympics (Athens)
- 2006 Commonwealth Games (Melbourne)
- 2008 Summer Olympics (Beijing)
- 2010 Commonwealth Games (Delhi)
- 2012 Summer Olympics (London)

Previously he was the race director of the Ironman Triathlon from 1987 to 1997, the executive director of the Halberg Trust for 17 years from 1988, and the Manager of the New Zealand Black Caps cricket team 2009–11.

He was also chairman of WEL Energy Trust 2008–09 and a motivational speaker.
