= Bridget Robinson =

New Zealand oncology academic

Bridget Robinson ONZM
- Education: University of Otago
- Scientific career
- Fields: Oncology
- Workplaces: University of Otago
- Thesis: Effects of vasoactive agents on tumour blood flow and cytotoxic drug uptake. (1985)

Bridget Anne Robinson ONZM is a New Zealand oncology academic. As of 2018, she is a full professor at the University of Otago, holding the Mackenzie Chair since 2010.

== Academic career ==
After a 1985 MD titled 'Effects of vasoactive agents on tumour blood flow and cytotoxic drug uptake' at the University of Otago, followed by a 1987 PhD of the same title, Robinson joined the staff in Christchurch in 1997, rising to full professor.

In the 2009 New Year Honours, Robinson was appointed an Officer of the New Zealand Order of Merit, for services to medicine.

== Selected works ==
- Hanrahan, Vickie, Margaret J. Currie, Sarah P. Gunningham, Helen R. Morrin, Prudence AE Scott, Bridget A. Robinson, and Stephen B. Fox. "The angiogenic switch for vascular endothelial growth factor (VEGF)-A, VEGF-B, VEGF-C, and VEGF-D in the adenoma–carcinoma sequence during colorectal cancer progression." The Journal of Pathology: A Journal of the Pathological Society of Great Britain and Ireland 200, no. 2 (2003): 183–194.
- Valle, Juan W., Daniel Palmer, Richard Jackson, Trevor Cox, John P. Neoptolemos, Paula Ghaneh, Charlotte L. Rawcliffe, Bridget A. Robinson, et al. "Optimal duration and timing of adjuvant chemotherapy after definitive surgery for ductal adenocarcinoma of the pancreas: ongoing lessons from the ESPAC-3 study." Journal of Clinical Oncology 32, no. 6 (2014): 504–512.
- Harvey, Vernon, Henning Mouridsen, Vladimir Semiglazov, Erik Jakobsen, Edouard Voznyi, Bridget A. Robinson, Vanina Groult, Michael Murawsky, and Soeren Cold. "Phase III trial comparing three doses of docetaxel for second-line treatment of advanced breast cancer." Journal of Clinical Oncology 24, no. 31 (2006): 4963–4970.
- Van Hazel, Guy A., Volker Heinemann, Navesh K. Sharma, M. P. Findlay, Jens Ricke, Marc Peeters, David Perez, Bridget A. Robinson, et al. "SIRFLOX: randomized phase III trial comparing first-line mFOLFOX6 (plus or minus bevacizumab) versus mFOLFOX6 (plus or minus bevacizumab) plus selective internal radiation therapy in patients with metastatic colorectal cancer." J Clin Oncol34, no. 15 (2016): 1723–1731.
