= Letty Brown =

New Zealand Māori community leader

Letty Brown ONZM
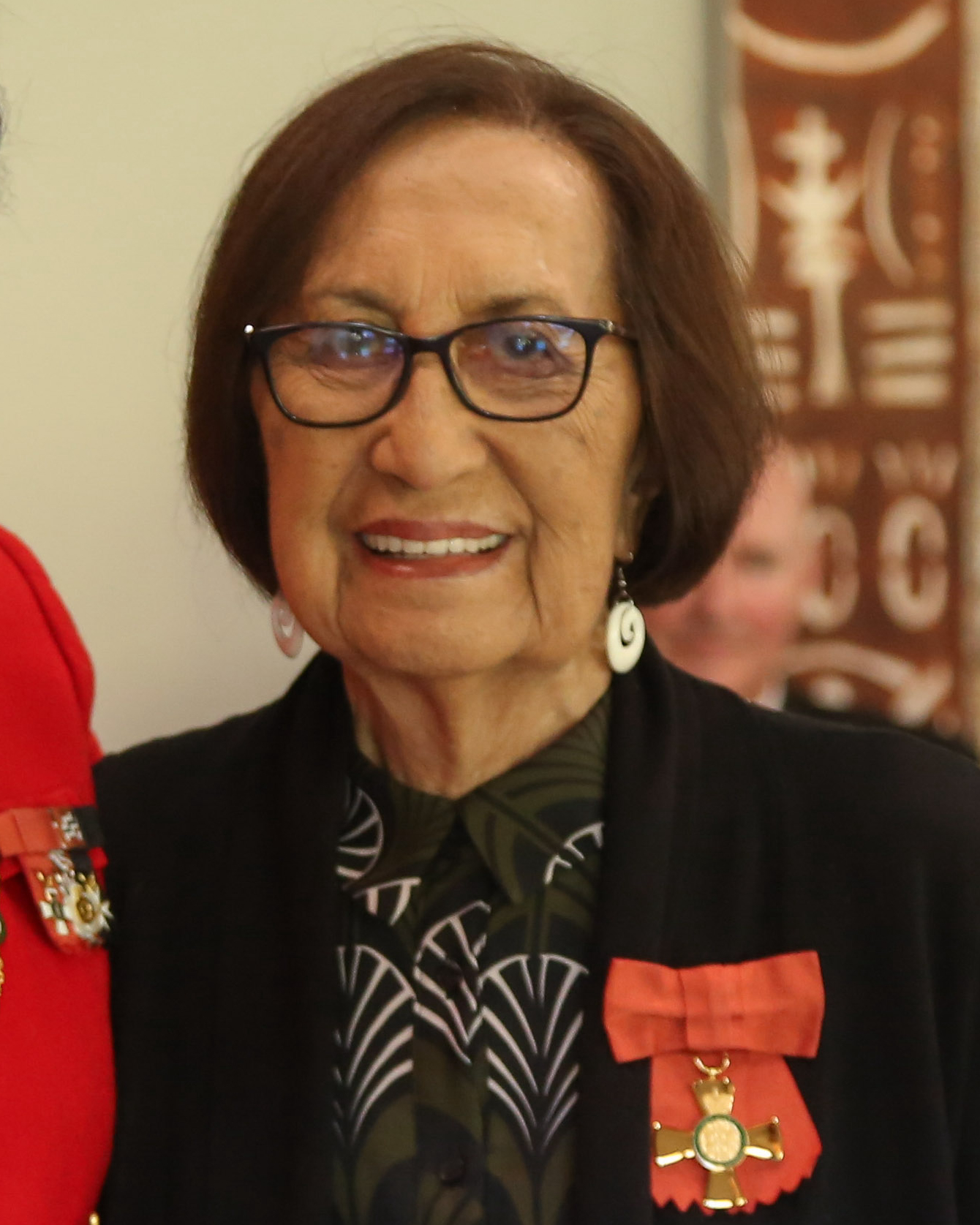
- Awards: Officer of the New Zealand Order of Merit, Queen's Service Medal

Ereti Taetuha Brown known as Letty ONZM is a New Zealand Māori community leader. In 2008, Brown was awarded a Queen's Service Medal for services to Māori and youth. In 2024, Brown was appointed an Officer of the New Zealand Order of Merit for services to Māori and early childhood education.

== Life ==
Brown was brought up in Te Araroa. She is Māori, and affiliates with Te Whānau-ā-Apanui and Ngāti Porou iwi. As a young mother in Te Atatū in the 1950s, Brown found she was the only Māori mother at her children's Playcentre because other Māori parents were uncomfortable in the predominantly Pākeha environment. She arranged special sessions for the Māori children, which proved popular. Brown went on to help build Hoana Waititi marae, a marae in West Auckland for urban Māori, and founded the Te Atatu branch of the Māori Women's Welfare League. She was also a founding member of the kapa haka group Manutaki.

Brown founded Te Puna Reo o Manawanui, a Māori language immersion pre-school, in 2000. It was one of the first Puna Reo in New Zealand.

In 2016, Six60 performed their song Mother's Eyes for Brown in her backyard for Mother's Day.

== Honours and awards ==
In 1968, Brown won the Young Māori Woman of the Year contest at the Māori Women's Welfare League conference. In the 2009 New Year Honours Brown was awarded a Queen's Service Medal for services to Māori and youth. In the 2024 New Year Honours Brown was appointed an Officer of the New Zealand Order of Merit for services to Māori and early childhood education.

Brown received an Honorary Doctorate from Te Whare Wananga o Wairaka in 2016. She was awarded Life Membership of the Māori Women’s Welfare League in 2017.
