= David Thorns =

New Zealand sociologist (1943–2020)

David Thorns ONZM
- Born: David Christopher Thorns; 26 August 1943; County Durham, England
- Died: 25 December 2020 (aged 77); Christchurch, New Zealand
- Spouse: Gloria Kathleen Corrigan (m. 1966; died 2018)
- Children: 2

Academic background
- Education: University of Sheffield; University of Exeter; University of Canterbury

Academic work
- Discipline: Sociology
- Sub-discipline: Urban sociology
- Institutions: University of Exeter; University of Auckland; University of Canterbury

David Christopher Thorns ONZM (26 August 1943 – 25 December 2020) was a New Zealand sociologist, particularly known for his work on urban and suburban sociology.

== Early life and family ==
Born in County Durham, England, in 1943, Thorns graduated with a Bachelor of Arts in economics from the University of Sheffield and a Master of Arts degree from the University of Exeter.

In 1966, Thorns married Gloria Kathleen Corrigan, and the couple went on to have two children.

== Career ==
After eight years as a lecturer in sociology at the University of Exeter, Thorns moved to the University of Auckland where he was appointed as a senior lecturer in sociology in 1974. He subsequently moved in 1977 to the University of Canterbury, where he remained for the rest of his career, rising to the rank of full professor. When he retired, he was conferred the title of professor emeritus. Thorns was awarded a Doctor of Letters degree by the University of Canterbury in 1982.

Regarded as one of New Zealand's leading social scientists, Thorns was noted for his work in urban and regional sociology, investigating themes including suburbia, the sociology of housing and residential mobility, social inequality, urban sustainability, and globalisation and urban change.

== Honours and awards ==
In 1995, Thorns was elected a Fellow of the Royal Society of New Zealand, and in 2002 he was awarded the University of Canterbury Research Medal. In the 2009 New Year Honours, he was appointed an Officer of the New Zealand Order of Merit, for services to urban sociology.

== Later life and death ==
Thorns' wife, Gloria, died in 2018. Thorns died in Christchurch on 25 December 2020.

== Selected publications ==
- Thorns, David C. (1972). Suburbia. London: MacGibbon and Kee. ISBN 0261632612.
- Thorns, David C. (1992). Fragmenting societies?: a comparative analysis of regional and urban development. London: Routledge. ISBN 041504135X.
- Thorns, David C. (2002). The transformation of cities: urban theory and urban life. Basingstoke: Palgrave Macmillan. ISBN 0333745965.
- Perkins, Harvey C.; Thorns, David C. (2012). Place, identity and everyday life in a globalizing world. Basingstoke: Palgrave Macmillan. ISBN 978-0230575905.
