= Katrina Brown =

Social scientist

- Born: 1960
- Education: University of Nottingham
- Partner: Neil Adger
- Scientific career
- Workplaces: University of Exeter University of East Anglia
- Thesis: Women's farming groups in a semi-arid region of Kenya: a case study of Tharaka division, Meru district (1990)

Katrina Brown is Emeritus Professor of Social Sciences at the University of Exeter in the UK, retiring in 2020. From 1991–2012, she was an academic and then Professor of Development Studies at the University of East Anglia.

== Education ==
Brown has a BSc from University of Newcastle upon Tyne, an MSc from the University of Reading, and a Ph.D. from the University of Nottingham (1990, Women's farming groups in a semi-arid region of Kenya). Following her Ph.D, she was at the University of East Anglia until 2012 at which point she moved to the University of Exeter.

== Contributions ==
Her areas of expertise include examinations of women's collective action and coping strategies in semi-arid Kenya, and environmental change, biodiversity and conservation. In 2016, she published the book Resilience, Development and Global Change that rethinks resilience concepts for development studies and practice.

She was formerly an editor of the journal Global Environmental Change, a member of the Resilience Alliance on the Scientific Committee of the IHDP, and was the lead author of the Millennium Ecosystem Assessment. She was also the Director of the Programme on Climate Change and International Development and Deputy Director for Social sciences at the Tyndall Centre for Climate Change Research.

== Awards and honors ==
- AXA Outlook Award (2013)
- Doctor Honoris Causa, University of Wageningen, Netherlands (2013)
- Fellow, Academy of Social Sciences (2018)
