= Roberta Farrell =

New Zealand biotechnologist

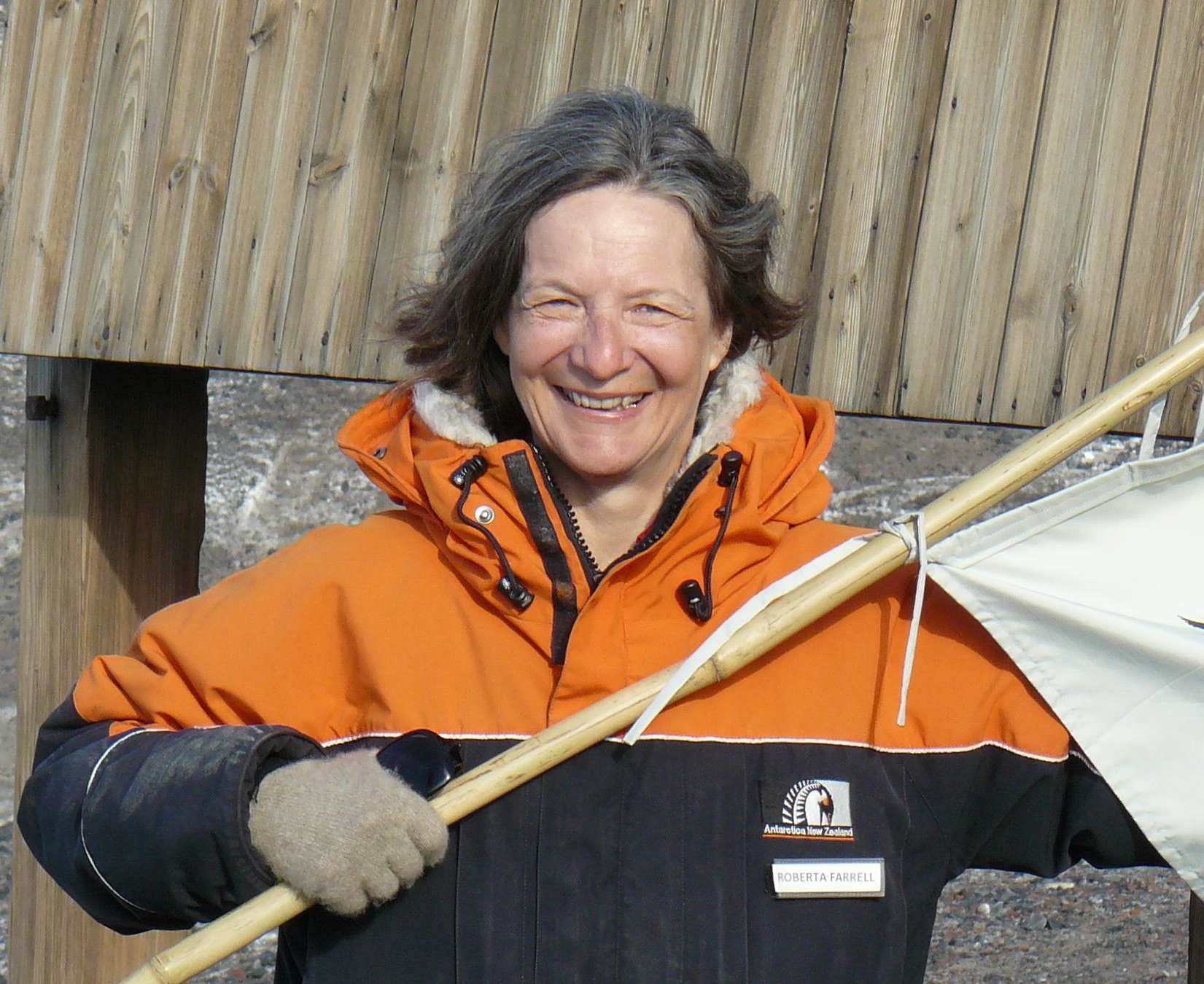
- Roberta Farrell at Hut Point
- Education: University of Missouri–St. Louis; University of Illinois Urbana-Champaign
- Scientific career
- Fields: Wood degradation Bioremediation; Fungi; Enzymology
- Workplaces: University of Waikato
- Website: Farrell at the University of Waikato

Roberta Lee Farrell CNZM FRSNZ is emeritus professor at the University of Waikato, New Zealand and a researcher in the fields of wood degradation, bioremediation, mycology and enzymology.

== Early life and education ==
Originally from the United States, Farrell received her bachelor's degree from the University of Missouri–St. Louis followed by an MSc and PhD from the University of Illinois Urbana-Champaign. Farrell conducted postdoctoral research at the University of Chicago 1979–1980 and at Massachusetts Institute of Technology from 1981 to 1984.

== Career and impact ==
Farrell started her career as a biotechnologist in the US, as associate director of research – industrial enzymes with Repligen Corporation in Cambridge, Massachusetts. She then became executive vice president and chief operating officer of Sandoz Chemicals Biotech Research Corporation and Repligen Sandoz Research Corporation. In 1995 she took a sabbatical PAPRO, Forest Research Institute in Rotorua, New Zealand and shortly after she emigrated and became a professor at Waikato University.

Since 2013, Farrell has been an emeritus professor at the University of Waikato in Hamilton, New Zealand. She also was an adjunct professor at North Carolina State University from 2008 until 2013. Farrell is recognised as an expert in cold-tolerant fungi and in the microbes and enzymes that affect wood; her work has had substantial impact in the biochemistry and biotechnology fields, specifically in the areas of enzymes, fungal ecology, bio-control, and cellulose.

Farrell also has led an international team on numerous expeditions to Antarctica. Her work in Antarctica has contributed to an understanding of the degradation of the Antarctic historic huts and artifacts and associated fungi, and she has performed critical work in the preservation of Ernest Shackleton's and Robert Scott's huts. She also contributed to some of the pivotal discoveries on microbiology of the McMurdo Dry Valleys.

Farrell was connected to private sector scientific research, and held a Directorship for Parrac Limited, where she was a founding scientist. She also was Founding Scientist of ZyGEM Ltd.

In total, Farrell has published over 100 research papers and book chapters, and holds 30 patents. Her research was featured in the documentary "The Green Chain" as well as in Māori Television’s “Project Matauranga”.

== Awards and honours ==
Select awards and honours include:

2015 – Appointment to University of Pretoria, Pretoria, South Africa Centre of Microbial Ecology and Genomics Advisory Board.

2011 – Named Influencer of the Year, Unlimited Magazine, Auckland, NZ.

2009 – Companion of The New Zealand Order of Merit for services to biochemical research. Distinguished Alumni Award, University of Missouri-St Louis.

2008 – Science Entrepreneur of the Year award at KuDos, the Hamilton Science Excellence Awards, appointment to Board New Zealand Foundation for Research Science and Technology.

2007 – Invitation to present Sir Holmes Miller Lecture, Wellington Branch New Zealand Antarctic Society, 22 November 2007.

2005 – Elected Fellow of The Royal Society of New Zealand.

1998 – Elected to the Academy Board of International Academy of Wood Science (1998–2004).

1990 – Elected Fellow of International Academy of Wood Science

== Selected works ==
- Kirk, T. Kent, and Roberta L. Farrell. "Enzymatic" combustion": the microbial degradation of lignin." Annual Reviews in Microbiology 41.1 (1987): 465–501.
- Kirk, T. Kent, et al. "Production of multiple ligninases by Phanerochaete chrysosporium: effect of selected growth conditions and use of a mutant strain." Enzyme and Microbial technology 8.1 (1986): 27–32.
- Farrell, Roberta L., et al. "Physical and enzymatic properties of lignin peroxidase isoenzymes from Phanerochaete chrysosporium." Enzyme and microbial technology 11.6 (1989): 322–328.
- Farrell, R.L., Blanchette, R.A., Brush, T.S., Hadar, Y., Iverson, S., Krisa, K., Wendler, P.A., Zimmerman, W. (1993). Cartapip™: a biopulping product for control of pitch and resin acid problems in pulp mills. J. Biotechnol. 30: 115–122.
- Farrell, R.L. (1998). Science, technology and end-users: optimising R&D for the commercial sector for society’s benefits. In Leadership Priorities for New Zealand Science and Technology sponsored by the Academy Council of The Royal Society of New Zealand, 5–6 November 1998. Miscellaneous series 54, pp. 127–131.
- Pointing, S.B., Chan, Y., Lacap, D.C., Lau, M.C.Y., Jurgens, J., Farrell, R.L., 2009. Highly specialized microbial diversity in hyper-arid polar desert . Proc Natl Acad Sci.USA, volume 106 no. 47 19964-19969. doi: 10.1073/pnas.0908274106. Epub 2009 Oct 22.
- Farrell, R.L., Arenz, B.E., Duncan, S.M., Held, B.W. Jurgens, J.A., Blanchette, R.A. 2011. Introduced and Indigenous Fungi of the Ross Island Historic Huts and Pristine Areas of Antarctica. Polar Biology. doi: 10.1007/s00300-011-1060-8.
- Chan Y., Van Nostrand J.D., Zhou J., Pointing, S.B., Farrell, R.L. 2013. Functional ecology of an Antarctic Dry Valleys landscape. Proc Natl Acad Sci (USA) 110: 8990–8995. doi: 10.1073/pnas.1300643110. Epub 2013 May 13.
