= Neil Adger =

Researcher

W. Neil Adger
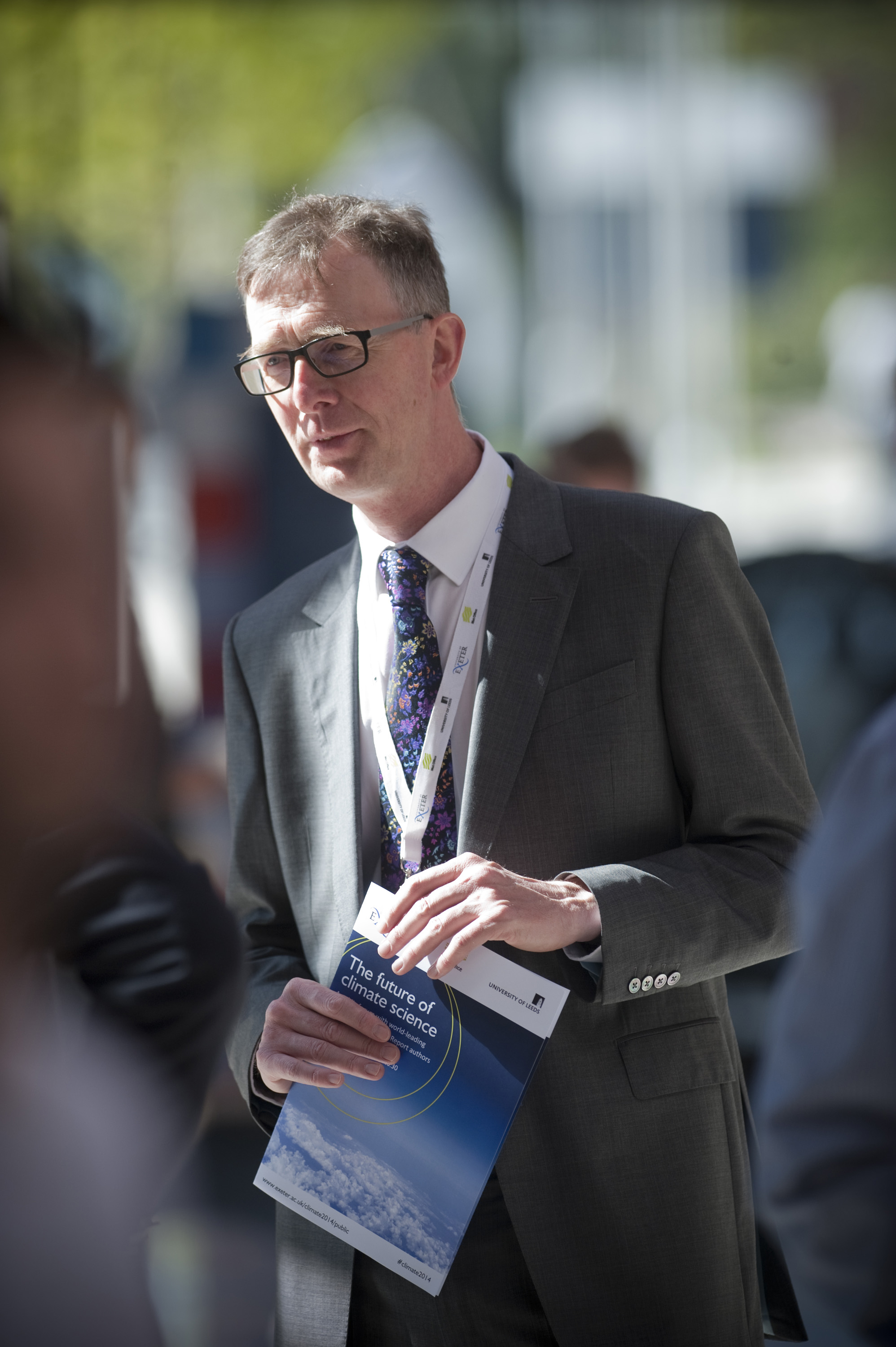
- Born: 1964 (age 61–62)
- Education: University of Edinburgh; Wye College, University of London; University of East Anglia
- Spouse: Katrina Brown
- Scientific career
- Workplaces: University of Exeter
- Thesis: Social vulnerability to climate change in Vietnam (1998)
- Doctoral advisor: Kerry Turner and Mick Kelly
- Website: Professor Neil Adger

William Neil Adger (born 1964) is Professor of Human Geography at the University of Exeter.

== Background ==
Neil Adger is Northern Irish, born in Ballymena. He was educated at the University of Edinburgh (MA Economics), Wye College, University of London (MSc Agricultural Economics) and the University of East Anglia (PhD, 1998).

== Contributions ==
Adger, an environmental economist by training, has been a significant contributor to debates about how social conditions and culture shape our vulnerability to climate change and our ability to adapt to it, with over 140,000 citations as of 2024. He has largely worked on group projects synthesizing cases and data, but has also worked closely on coastal vulnerability and migration resulting from climate change in Vietnam and Bangladesh.

He has been a Co-ordinating Lead Author for the Intergovernmental Panel on Climate Change, contributing significantly to reports in 2001 and 2007.

== Awards ==
- Philip Leverhulme Prize, 2001
- Thomson Reuters Highly Cited Scientist.
- Frontiers of Knowledge award 2012, BBVA Foundation

== Key Publications ==
- Adger, W. N. (2006) Vulnerability. Global Environmental Change 16 (3), 268-281. https://doi.org/10.1016/j.gloenvcha.2006.02.006
- Adger, W. N. (2000). Social and ecological resilience: are they related? Progress in Human Geography, 24(3), 347-364. https://doi.org/10.1191/030913200701540465
- W. N. Adger, NW Arnell, EL Tompkins (2005). Successful adaptation to climate change across scales. Global Environmental Change. 15(2), 77-86.
