= Journal of Environmental Management =

- Discipline: Environmental science and quality
- Language: English
- Edited by: Raf Dewil, Jason Evans, Lixiao Zhang

Publication details
- History: 1973–present
- Publisher: Elsevier
- Frequency: Semi-monthly
- Open access: Hybrid
- Impact factor: 8.910 (2021)

Standard abbreviations
- ISO 4: J. Environ. Manag.

Indexing
- Journal of Environmental Management
- CODEN: JEVMAW
- ISSN: 0301-4797 (print); 1095-8630 (web)
- LCCN: 73643864
- OCLC no.: 163420681
- Advances in Environmental Research
- CODEN: AERDDP
- ISSN: 1093-0191
- LCCN: 97640924
- OCLC no.: 795967722

Links
- Journal homepage; Online archive

The Journal of Environmental Management is a semi-monthly peer-reviewed scientific journal covering research on environmental science and quality that was established in 1973 by Academic Press in London. It is currently published by Elsevier and the editors-in-chief are Raf Dewil (KU Leuven), Jason Evans (Stetson University), and Lixiao Zhang (Beijing Normal University).

== History ==

The journal absorbed Advances in Environmental Research which was published between 1997 and 2004. The open access journal Environmental Challenges, published since 2020, is a companion journal.

== Abstracting and indexing ==
The journal is abstracted and indexed in:

- Aquatic Sciences and Fisheries Abstracts
- Biological Abstracts
- BIOSIS Previews
- CAB Abstracts
- Chemical Abstracts Service
- Current Contents/Agriculture, Biology & Environmental Sciences
- EBSCO databases
- Ei Compendex
- Embase
- GEOBASE
- Index Islamicus
- Index Medicus/MEDLINE/PubMed
- International Bibliography of the Social Sciences
- PASCAL
- ProQuest databases
- Science Citation Index Expanded
- Scopus,
- The Zoological Record

According to the Journal Citation Reports, the journal has a 2021 impact factor of 8.910, ranking it 34th out of 279 journals in the category "Environmental Sciences".
