= COVID-19 pandemic in New Zealand =

- Disease: COVID-19
- Pathogen: SARS-CoV-2
- Location: New Zealand
- First outbreak: Wuhan, Hubei, China
- Index case: Auckland, Auckland Region
- Arrival date: 28 February 2020 (6 years, 8 months and 3 weeks ago)
- Confirmed cases: 2,627,114 (total; all case data are cumulative to – or 'current' status as of – 17 April 2024)
- Active cases: 2,618
- Suspected cases: 44,222 (total)
- Recovered: 2,620,552
- Deaths: 3,944
- Fatality rate: 0.15%

Government website
- www.covid19.govt.nz

The COVID-19 pandemic in New Zealand was part of the pandemic of coronavirus disease 2019 (COVID-19) caused by severe acute respiratory syndrome coronavirus 2 (SARS-CoV-2). The first case of the disease in New Zealand was reported on 28 February 2020. The country recorded over 2,274,370 cases (2,217,047 confirmed and 57,323 probable (Note: A probable case is one without a positive laboratory result, but which is treated like a confirmed case based on its exposure history and clinical symptoms.)). Over 3,000 people died as a result of the pandemic, with cases recorded in all twenty district health board (DHB) areas. The pandemic first peaked in early April 2020, with 89 new cases recorded per day and 929 active cases. Cases peaked again in October 2021 with 134 new cases reported on 22 October.

In response to the first outbreak in late February 2020, the New Zealand Government closed the country's borders and imposed lockdown restrictions. A four-tier alert level system was introduced on 21 March 2020 to manage the outbreak within New Zealand. After a two-month nationwide lockdown, from 26 March to 27 May 2020, regionalised alert level changes were also used; the Auckland Region entered lockdown twice, in August–September 2020 and February–March 2021. The country then went for several months without any community transmission, with all cases restricted to the managed isolation system.

In August 2021, New Zealand entered nationwide lockdown due to a case of community transmission in Auckland of the SARS-CoV-2 Delta variant, with subsequent community cases in Auckland and Wellington. Due to rising cases nationwide, the Government abandoned its elimination strategy while accelerating the country's vaccination rollout. Auckland remained in a form of lockdown until 3 December 2021 when the new COVID-19 Protection Framework ("traffic light system") came into effect. Between February and May 2022, the Government gradually eased border restrictions, public gathering limits, and vaccine mandate requirements. In September 2022, the Government ended the COVID-19 Protection Framework, lifting the remaining vaccine mandates and mask requirements. On 15 August 2023, the Government lifted all remaining COVID-19 restrictions.

== Background ==
On 12 January 2020, the World Health Organization (WHO) confirmed that a novel coronavirus (SARS-CoV-2) was the cause of a respiratory illness (coronavirus disease 2019, or COVID-19), found in a cluster of people in Wuhan, Hubei, People's Republic of China, which had been reported to the WHO on 31 December 2019.

The case fatality ratio for COVID-19 has been much lower than SARS of 2003, but the transmission has reportedly been significantly greater, according to a statement by Prof. Azra Ghani from MRC Centre for Global Infectious Disease Analysis, Imperial College London, a World Health Organization collaborating centre.

== Transmission timeline ==
On 28 February 2020, New Zealand confirmed its first case, a woman in her 60s who had recently visited Iran The country confirmed its second case on 4 March, a woman who had recently returned from northern Italy. The number of cases continued to rise significantly through March 2020, reaching a total of 647 (600 confirmed and 47 probable) and 74 recoveries by 31 March.

On 29 March, New Zealand also reported its first coronavirus-related death, a woman in her 70s from the West Coast region.

Cases

Deaths

On 5 April 2020, the first ethnicity statistics were released; indicating that 74% of those who had contracted COVID-19 were Pākehā, 8.3% Asian, 7.6% Māori, and 3.3% Pasifika. By 31 July, the total number of cases had reached 1,560, the total number of recovered had risen to 1,518, while the death toll had risen to 22.

Following 102 days of no community transmissions, four such cases were reported in Auckland on 11 August 2020, putting the city back into lockdown. According to 1News, Pacific Islanders made up 75% of the cases in the August community outbreak in Auckland. By 5 September, the national death toll had reached 24 with the death of former Cook Islands Prime Minister Joe Williams.

Apart from some community cases, most cases reported in New Zealand during the second half of 2020 were reported at the border. By 31 December 2020, there were a total of 2,162 cases; 2,082 recoveries, and 25 deaths in New Zealand.

New Zealand's Swiss cheese model for managing COVID-19

On 25 January 2021, New Zealand identified its first community spread case of COVID-19 since November 2020 on Sunday after a 56-year-old woman tested positive for the coronavirus strain that is thought to have originated in South Africa. On 14 February, three community transmission cases were reported within a family in Papatoetoe, Auckland. Apart from some community cases, most recorded cases in New Zealand occurred at the border prior to August 2021. By 30 July 2021, the total number of cases had reached 2,870; the total number of recoveries had reached 2,799 while the death toll had reached 26.

On 17 August 2021, the Ministry of Health announced one new community case of COVID-19 in Auckland. In response, the Government moved the country into Alert Level 4 effective 11.59pm 17 August 2021. By 19 August the number of community cases had reached 21, with most being from the Delta variant. Following the August 2021 outbreak in Auckland, the number of both community and border cases in New Zealand rose substantially, reaching a total of 14,118 cases by 31 December 2021. The total number of recoveries also reached to 12,870 while the death toll rose to 51. On 29 December 2021, British musician Robert Etheridge (Dimension) was identified as the country's first Omicron case.

In early 2022, the total number of recorded cases rose exponentially; rising from 16,416 cases on 31 January to 100,821 on 28 February. In addition, the death toll reached 56 while the total number of recoveries reached 18,332 on 28 February 2022. Covid-19 Modelling Aotearoa project leader Dion O'Neale attributed the sharp rise of reported cases in February 2022 to backlogs in polymerase chain reaction (PCR) testing and data processing as well as the recent introduction of rapid antigen testing (RATS) for public usage.

== Responses ==
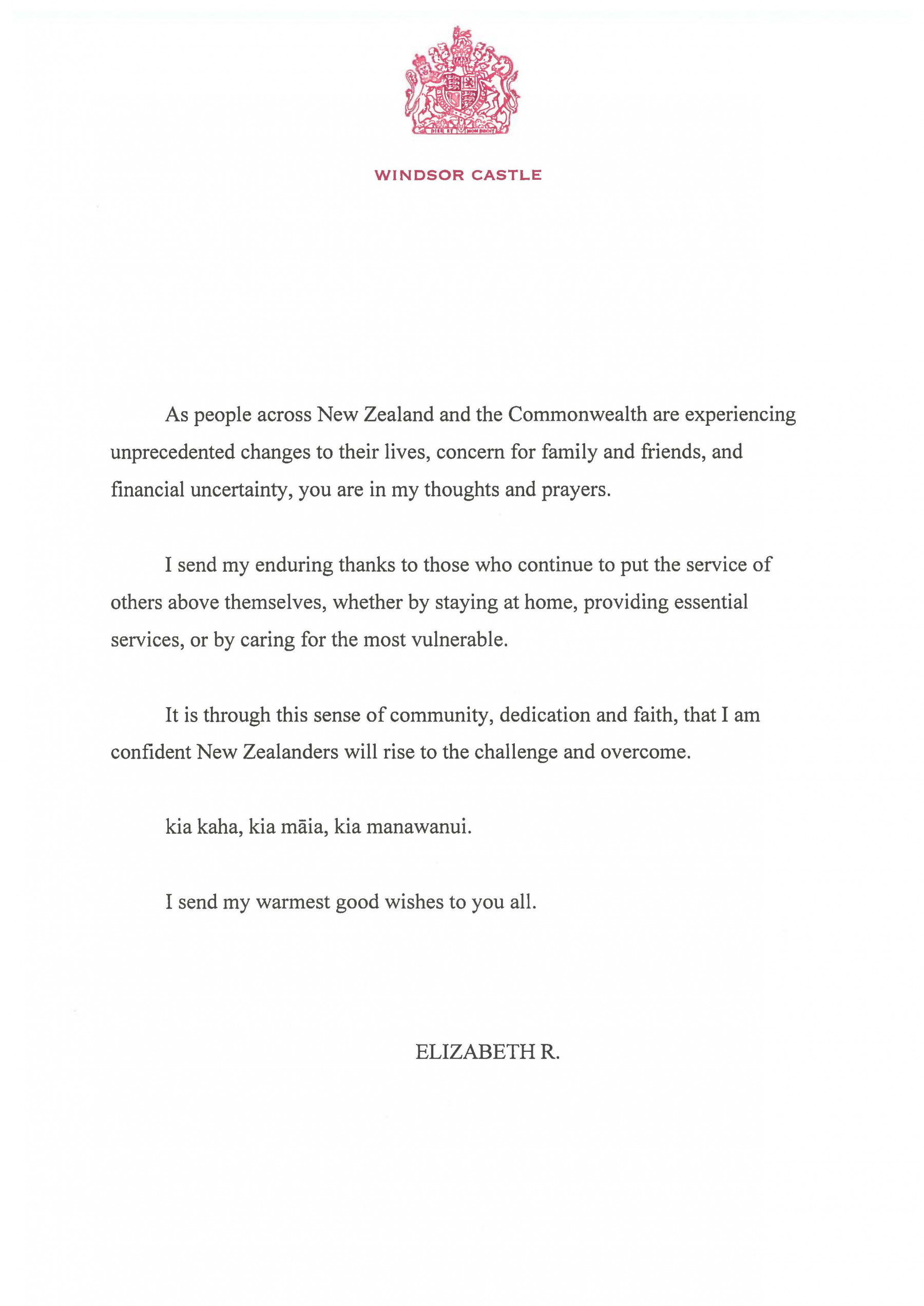
The Queen's message to New Zealanders, stating that she is confident Kiwis will "rise to the challenge and overcome" the coronavirus pandemic.

=== Central government responses ===
The New Zealand Government responded to the global COVID-19 pandemic by establishing a National Health Coordination Centre (NHCC). In early February 2020, the Government barred entry to most travellers from China in response to the global COVID-19 pandemic that originated in Wuhan. In addition, the Government sponsored several repatriation flights for returning citizens, residents, and their family members, beginning with Wuhan in February 2020.

In response to rising cases from overseas travel and within the community, Prime Minister Jacinda Ardern closed the country's borders to non-citizens and non-residents on 19 March 2020. On 21 March, the Government introduced a four-tier alert level system, which placed much of the country's population and economy into lockdown from 25 March. Due to the success of the Government's elimination strategy in reducing the spread of COVID-19, lockdown restrictions on mobility, social gatherings and economic activities were progressively lifted on 28 April, 11 May, 25 May, and 8 June. The lifting of Alert Level 1 restrictions on 8 June eliminated social distancing and lockdown restrictions but retained border restrictions. On 13 May, the Government passed the controversial COVID-19 Public Health Response Act 2020 which empowered law enforcement to enter homes and other premises without a warrant in order to enforce lockdown restrictions.

On 11 August 2020, the Government reinstated lockdown restrictions following a second outbreak of community transmissions in Auckland. Due to the reduction in community transmissions, lockdown restrictions in Auckland and the rest of New Zealand were progressively eliminated on 30 August, 23 September, and 7 October 2020. In early November, the Government required travellers entering New Zealand to book a place in managed isolation prior to travelling to the country. In mid-December 2020, the Government announced plans to establish travel bubbles with the Cook Islands and Australia in 2021.

Following a community outbreak in South Auckland's Papatoetoe suburb on 14 February 2021, the Government placed an Alert Level 3 lockdown on Auckland and an Alert Level 2 lockdown over the rest of the country until 17 February. On 17 February, Auckland's lockdown was lowered to Alert Level 2 while the rest of the country reverted to Alert Level 1. On 22 February, the Government announced that Auckland would revert to Alert Level 1 on 22 February. Following new community cases that were connected to the Auckland February cluster, the Government placed an Alert Level 3 lockdown on Auckland and an Alert Level 2 lockdown over the rest of the country commencing 28 February 2021 for the next seven days.

Following a new community outbreak in Auckland in August 2021, the NZ Government reinstated Alert Level 4 restrictions on 17 August 2021. Due to rising cases in Auckland and parts of the North Island, the Government abandoned its elimination strategy while accelerating the country's vaccination rollout. The "alert level system" was subsequently replaced by the COVID-19 Protection Framework ("traffic light system"), which came into force on 3 December 2021. In addition, the Government launched a COVID-19 vaccination pass system, which came into effect on 16 November 2021. On 23 November, the Government passed the COVID-19 Response (Vaccinations) Legislation Act 2021, which provided a legal framework for the "traffic light system" and vaccine mandates for certain occupations.

On 17 January 2022, the Government launched its vaccination rollout for children aged between five and 12 years. In late January, the Government also launched a three-stage plan to combat the spread of the SARS-CoV-2 Omicron variant based on contact tracing, testing and self-isolation. On 3 February, the Government also launched a five-stage plan to reopen New Zealand's borders throughout 2022. On 23 March, the Government eased several "traffic light" restrictions including limits on public gatherings, vaccine pass requirements, vaccine mandates for most occupations, and NZ COVID Tracer QR code scanning requirements. In May 2022, the Government also accelerated the reopening of the border for various work, visitor and student visa classes. In mid September 2022, the Government abolished the "traffic light system," ending most remaining COVID-19 mask, vaccine, and close contact isolation mandates and restrictions.

In mid October 2022, the Government scrapped several of the COVID-19 Public Health Response Act 2020's provisions including its powers to implement lockdowns, managed isolation and quarantine (MIQ), border closures, vaccine passes and mandates. The Government however opted to retain the Act's provisions for seven-day isolation periods, mask use and border entry requirements until Parliament passed newer, general pandemic legislation. The Government also revoked the Epidemic Notice, signalling a shift from emergency management to long-term management of COVID-19. In addition, COVID-19 Response Minister Chris Hipkins confirmed that the Government would hold a Royal Commission of Inquiry into its response to the COVID-19 pandemic.

=== Genome sequencing ===
During the further outbreak of COVID-19 cases in Auckland in August 2020, genome sequencing was noted as a "new tool" in the Government's strategy to manage the pandemic. Ashley Bloomfield said "we are also doing genome sequencing on all those who have tested positive and our recent cases and current cases in managed isolation and quarantine". A phylodynamics specialist said that compared to the first outbreak when only 25 people out of approximately 1000 were sequenced, "mapping the genetic sequences of the virus from confirmed COVID-19 cases in a bid to track its spread – is now an integral part of New Zealand's coronavirus response. It is providing greater certainty in identifying clusters and helps focus the investigations of contact tracers." Bloomfield said that sequencing will provide information about how the outbreak started and Jemma Geoghegan, a senior lecturer in viral evolution at the University of Otago who was working on genome sequencing with the Institute of Environmental Science and Research (ESR), told Radio New Zealand:

By comparing the genomes of the new cases to those from the isolation facilities as well as the global population and the other cases in New Zealand, we can begin to understand how long that chain of transmission potentially is, and likely estimate when that virus emerged and first arrived into New Zealand.

When an Air New Zealand crew member tested positive for COVID-19 in November 2020, Joel de Ligt, a scientist at ESR, said that while he was reasonably confident the sequencing had provided a good picture of what was happening across the country, there was still a slight chance that there was something in the community not identified. Specific sequencing of the genomes of the air crew member would show whether it was linked to a New Zealand genome, or related to information from sequencing overseas, making it "more likely that it is what we call a travel-related infection, where we might start to look more in detail at the airports, or the airlines involved with the movements of a certain person." Geoghegan stressed the importance of genome sequencing in cases such as returning air crew, which was later used to demonstrate a case of in-flight transmission.

=== Local and regional governmental responses ===
On 20 March, the Auckland Council closed all public libraries, swimming pools, and recreational centres, including the Auckland Art Gallery and the New Zealand Maritime Museum.

On 21 March, several local body councils in Auckland, Wellington, Christchurch, Dunedin, Lower Hutt and Porirua announced the closures of public facilities including swimming pools, libraries, recreation centres, community centres, art galleries, and museums.

On 24 March, the Auckland Council announced they were closing their campgrounds and Canterbury Regional Council announced that they would also close New Zealand Motor Caravan Association camping grounds within 48 hours.

Auckland Council announced on 14 April that it was applying for special project funding for a number of infrastructure projects that had been suspended due to lockdown.

On 15 April, several Otago mayors including mayor of Dunedin Aaron Hawkins, Central Otago District mayor Tim Cadogan, Queenstown Lakes District mayor Jim Boult, Clutha District mayor Bryan Cadogan, Waitaki District mayor Gary Kircher and Otago Regional Council chair Marian Hobbs were donating part of their salaries to local charities to assist with coronavirus pandemic relief efforts. In addition, several Dunedin City Council officials including chief executive Sue Bidrose announced that they were taking pay cuts to help their local communities cope with the effects of COVID-19.

On 10 July, the Auckland Council announced that it was going to eliminate 500 permanent jobs as a result of the economic effects of the COVID-19 pandemic.

On 27 August, Auckland councillor Efeso Collins called for the Government to grant an amnesty to people who had overstayed their visas in order to encourage members of the Pasifika community to come forward for COVID-19 tests. The Health Minister Chris Hipkins has reassured the Pasifika community that the Government would not use any information collected during testing for immigration purposes. Collins urged Pacific community leaders, church leaders and health professionals to encourage overstayers to get tested for COVID-19 without fear of repercussions.

On 12 November, Mayor of Auckland Phil Goff and local health authorities have urged people in the Auckland CBD area to work from home after the discovery of a community transmission case who worked at the A-Z Collections shop on Auckland's High St in the city centre. Goff also criticised the store's owner for allegedly telling the employee to come to work while she was awaiting test results for her COVID-19 test. The store owner disputed Goff's account, explaining that the employee had called on Tuesday to say she had a sore throat and would be visiting a doctor. The following day, the shop worker issued a statement criticising health officials who interviewed her for not providing a Chinese language translator, causing misinformation about her prior whereabouts, actions, and contacts. As a result of this miscommunication, her employer and their families had received abusive online messages.

On 2 November 2021, Far North District Mayor John Carter supported the Government's decision to impose a Level 3 lockdown in the northern part of the Northland Region following two undetected cases. He urged people to get tested and vaccinated.

=== Health sector responses ===
On 19 March, the medical recruitment company MedWorld appealed for retired and part-time doctors to assist efforts by the health sector and Government to combat the spread of COVID-19.

On 10 June, St John New Zealand, which provides ambulance and first aid services, announced that it would be laying off staff due to a $30 million deficit caused by the COVID-19 pandemic. The organisation had also tried to apply for the Government's wage subsidy scheme but was told that it was not eligible for it despite a 40% drop in income.

On 27 August, Pasifika GP Network member Api Talemaitoga announced that the Government's Testing Strategy Group would seek to ensure that members of the Māori and Pasifika communities would have fair access to testing. These measures include offering free testing, mobile testing centres and clinicians who could translate. Health authorities have also sought to reassure members of these communities that they would not lose their jobs due to contracting COVID-19.

Following the Delta community outbreak in mid–August 2021, the New Zealand Nurses Organisation (NZNO) expressed concerned about the mental and physical health of nurses, midwives, and healthcare assistants; insufficient PPE supplies and a lack of mask fit-testing. In mid-September 2021, the NZNO challenged the Auckland District Health Board's "free-for-all" visitor policy through the Employment Relations Authority. The NZNO argued that the Health Board's policy of allowing two visitors during the Delta outbreak posed a health risk to patients and staff.

In October 2021, Pharmac negotiated an agreement with supplier Merck Sharp & Dohme (MSD) to purchase the experimental antiviral pill molnupiravir. If approved by Medsafe, Pharmac will be supplied with 60,000 courses of the pill, which would be used to treat New Zealanders with mild to moderate Covid-19 symptoms. In November, Pharmac secured 500 doses of baricitinib, an oral tablet that improves outcomes for hospitalised patients and purchased Ronapreve (also known as Regeneron), a monoclonal antibody.

From September 2021, the Ministry of Health began allocating funding to district health boards to the Support in Isolation/Quarantine (SIQ) programme with the goal of establishing local quarantine facilities to accommodate those who could not isolate at home in " community-based bubbles." The SIQ programme was established in response to rising community cases and plans to reopen the border in 2022. New Zealand has announced a progressive reopening of its borders as it begins to ease some of the world's most stringent Covid regulations. Vaccinated Australian nationals will be able to return home on 27 February without having to go through the state's required hotel quarantine. Jabbed nationals from other countries will be allowed in starting 13 March, according to Prime Minister Jacinda Ardern. People will still be required to self-isolate for 10 days, but they will be able to do so at home.

In mid October 2021, the Health Ministry allocated NZ$120,000 to the Wairarapa District Health Board to establish local SIQ facilities. In addition, other district health boards including the Taranaki District Health Board, the Auckland District Health Board, the Southern District Health Board, and the Whanganui District Health Board have made preparations to establish their own SIQ facilities at various repurposed hotels and holiday parks.

On 17 February 2022, laboratory workers, contact tracers and other critical health staff affiliated with the Public Service Association (PSA) voted to reject a pay offer from the district health boards and to strike twice in March 2022. The workers have demanded higher pay, equal treatment with other health professions, and safe staffing and retention. Union spokesperson Will Matthews stated that the planned strikes came after 15 months of failed negotiations with the district health boards. In mid-February 2022, the Institute of Medical Laboratory Science, the national representative body for laboratory workers, reported that many workers were burnt out from operating under poor conditions for the past two years of the COVID-19 pandemic. Workers complained about insufficient office and recreation space due to extra testing machinery within their laboratories.

In mid-May 2022, 10,000 allied health workers went on strike across New Zealand following failed negotiations with DHBs over pay and working conditions. The PSA's strike action was supported by the Association of Salaried Medical Specialists (ASMS), the New Zealand Dental Association (NZDA) and the NZ Council of Trade Unions (CTU).

In early June 2022, the Dunedin Hospital was closed to visitors following an outbreak of COVID-19 within its wards.

=== Economic impact ===
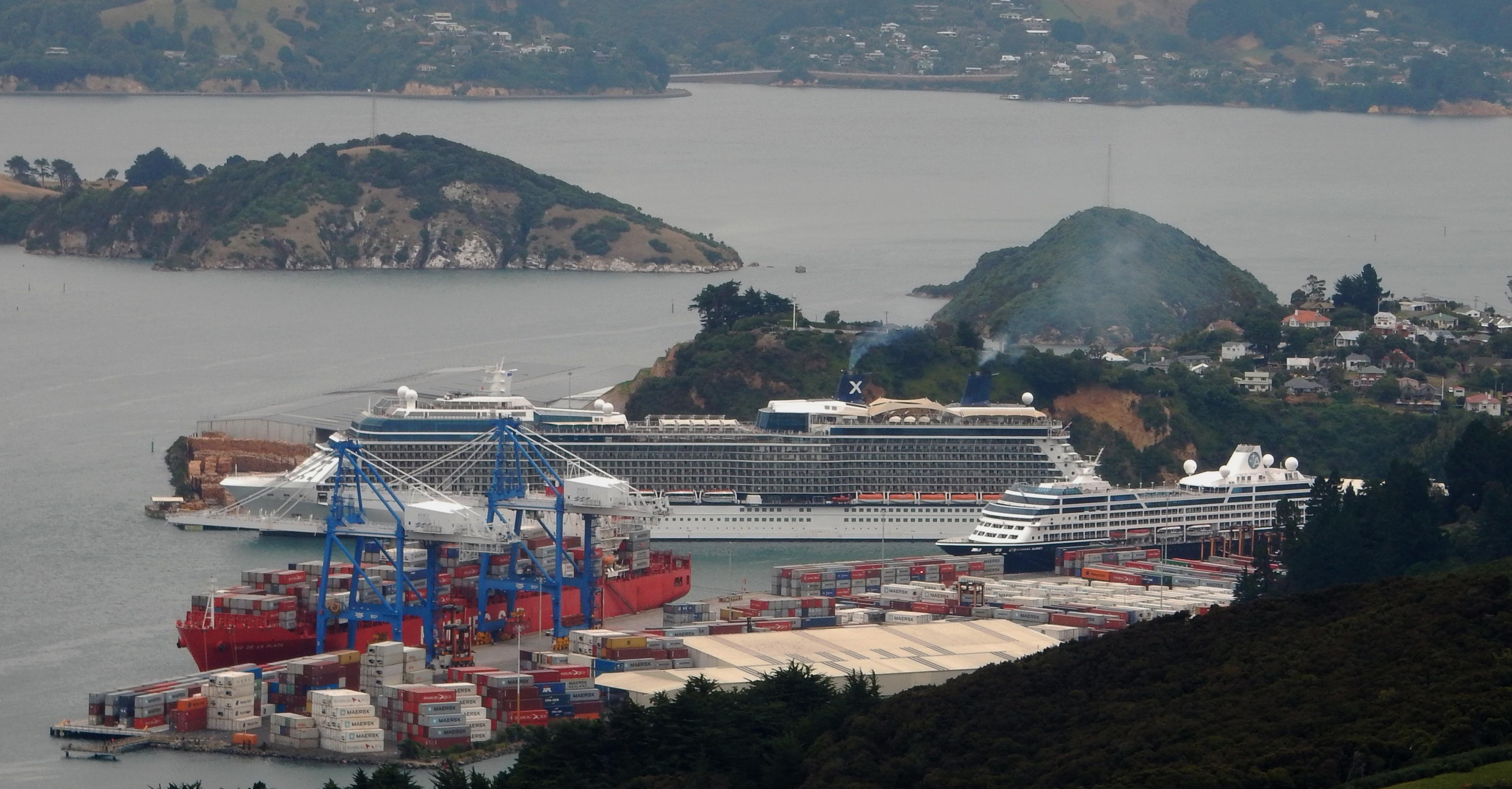
Two cruise ships—Celebrity Solstice and Azamara Journey—in Port Chalmers on 15 March

Up until March 2020, New Zealand ran a mixed economy – a free market with some state ownership and control. Although somewhat abruptly sidelined from their normal influence within the New Zealand economy, representatives of the business sector continued to feature in media reporting: lobbying against perceived discrepancies in various industries, publicising habitual evaluations such as business-confidence indicators and economic outlooks, and itching for an early return to "business as usual".

On 17 September 2020, New Zealand economy officially entered into a recession, with the country's gross domestic product contracting by 12.2% in the June quarter due to the COVID-19 pandemic. The retail, accommodation, hospitality, and transportation sectors were adversely affected by the international travel ban and a strict nationwide lockdown.

=== Social impact ===
The COVID-19 pandemic had a substantial impact on New Zealand society, with significant implications for education, faith communities, holidays, Māori, mass gatherings, sports and recreational activities. Reports about the spread of COVID-19 led to a high demand for face masks and hand sanitisers.

==== Education ====
Following the spread of COVID-19 at several schools, the Government closed all schools, early childhood centres and universities on 23 March 2020 as part of the implementation of a nationwide lockdown. In addition, on 13 May, the end-of-year high school National Certificate of Educational Achievement (NCEA) external exams were postponed to mid November 2020. Several universities drew criticism for continuing to charge rent to students who had returned home to their families.

==== Faith communities ====
In response to the entry of COVID-19 into New Zealand, several faith communities announced that they would be suspending or reducing public gatherings in responds to the Government's ban on gatherings with more than 100 people. Due to the closure of butcheries under Alert Level 4, members of the Muslim community faced difficulty accessing halal food. When the lockdown level was first lowered to Alert Level 2 on 14 May, religious gatherings were initially limited to ten persons, which drew criticism from the Federation of Islamic Associations of New Zealand (FIANZ), Catholic bishops, and Bishop Brian Tamaki of Destiny Church. Following criticism, the Government raised the limit on religious services from ten to 100 persons, allowing many faith communities to resume mass gatherings. In September 2020, Christian leaders Pacific Response Coordination Team chairman Pakilau Manase Lua and Wesleyan Methodist minister Frank Ritchie expressed concern about misinformation relating to COVID-19 circulating among New Zealand congregants attending churches with links to conservative evangelical and Pentecostal churches in the United States.

==== Māori ====
In response to the COVID-19 pandemic, Māori communities in the Northland, East Cape, and Bay of Plenty regions of the North Island established road blocks to limit the spread of the virus. These checkpoints generated some communal tensions and were considered unauthorised by the Government and New Zealand Police, which challenged their authority. Following a new community outbreak in Auckland in late January 2021, Northland Māori including Reuben Taipari and veteran politician Hone Harawira established an unauthorised checkpoint, which was shut down by the police.

==== Mass gatherings ====
Due to the COVID-19 pandemic, mass gatherings were discouraged to comply with social distancing measures to combat the virus. In response, the Royal New Zealand Returned and Services' Association suspended all ANZAC Day service and red poppy collections for 2020. Following the murder of George Floyd in May 2020, which sparked global protests, Black Lives Matter protests were held in several major centres including Auckland, Wellington and Christchurch in early June 2020. These protests were criticised by several health and political figures including Siouxsie Wiles, Prime Minister Jacinda Ardern, Deputy Prime Minister Winston Peters, and ACT Party leader David Seymour for flouting social distancing restrictions. In addition, anti-lockdown protests occurred between August and September 2020.

Due to border and social distancing restrictions caused by COVID-19, several sports and recreational events including the Super Rugby season and the 2020 Warbirds Over Wanaka airshow were suspended in mid-March 2020.

Following a new community outbreak in South Auckland in mid February 2021, the Halberg Awards were postponed to comply with Alert Level 3 restrictions on mass gatherings. In addition, Napier's Art Deco Festival and Auckland's Gay Pride parade were cancelled. Auckland's Splore festival was postponed to 26–28 March 2021.

In February 2022, on the grounds of New Zealand's parliament, police gave trespass notices to anti-vaccine protestors who had spent two nights illegally camped. More than 50 were arrested.

==== Pacific Islanders ====
Left-wing blogger Martyn Bradbury has advocated that the Government declare an amnesty for overstayers and provide compensation payments to people unable to work from home in order to help the Pacific Islander communities in South Auckland.

=== Travel ===
The COVID-19 pandemic had a significant impact on travel to and from New Zealand. In 2020, the New Zealand Government worked with airlines and tour agencies to repatriate New Zealanders stranded at various overseas locations including China, Peru, Australia, Uruguay, Fiji, and India. On 24 March, the Foreign Minister Winston Peters estimated there were 80,000 New Zealanders stranded overseas, of whom 17,000 had registered with the Ministry of Foreign Affairs and Trade's "Safe Travel" programme. Following a rapid surge in COVID-19 cases in India in April 2021, many New Zealand citizens and temporary visa holders living there were stranded due to border restrictions and flight cancellations.

The COVID-19 pandemic also affected many foreign travellers and temporary visa holders in New Zealand. Due to travel restrictions caused by COVID-19, the New Zealand Government automatically extended all temporary visas until 25 September 2020, which was later extended to February 2021. In addition, the Government also extended emergency welfare support including financial support for living expenses to stranded migrant workers and other temporary visa holders unable to leave New Zealand. Despite border restrictions, the Government granted visa exemptions for certain critical and essential workers as well as people attending the trial of the Christchurch mosque shooter Brenton Tarrant and a British family seeking to sell their yacht following the death of their son.

Several foreign governments including the United Kingdom, Germany, and Denmark also organised charter flights to repatriate citizens stranded in New Zealand. In addition, international airlines like Lufthansa and Qatar Airways were also involved in facilitating repatriation flights from New Zealand. By 13 May, Foreign Minister Peters confirmed that 50,000 migrant workers had returned to their home countries following efforts by the New Zealand Government and foreign embassies to organise repatriation flights.

On 9 May 2021, Radio New Zealand and Stuff reported that the Government had spent NZ$6 million to repatriate New Zealanders who had been stranded overseas at various locations including Wuhan, India and Peru since the start of the pandemic. On 28 May 2021, it was also reported that the Government had spent $112,000 out of a $900,000 allocation to repatriate migrants who could not afford flight tickets back to their home countries during the pandemic. In addition, the Government had spent $11 million on attracting migrants during the pandemic. In addition, the Government had spent $242 million in February 2021 to address a deficit in immigration's visa account finances, which still left a $56 million deficit.

On 11 August 2021, the Strategic Covid-19 Public Health Advisory Group led by Professor David Skegg advocated that the country should take a phased approach towards reopening its border in 2022 provided that a majority of New Zealanders had been vaccinated. Under proposed plans, travellers could avoid going into managed isolation based on risk factors such as their vaccination status and the state of the pandemic in their country of origin. Other proposals include pre-departure testing for travellers and rapid testing for travellers upon entry to New Zealand.

Following the Delta community outbreak in mid–August 2021, the Police were criticised by Northland Māori iwi and leaders including former politician Hone Harawira for waiting more than a week to erect fixed checkpoints between Northland and Auckland after the country moved into an Alert Level 4 lockdown. The Level 4 announcement on 17 August had triggered an influx of people from Auckland into the Northland region. Other Northland residents criticised inconsistency in the location of Police checkpoints near the Brynderwyn Hills, Kaiwaka and Mangawhai which inhibited travel by residents to access essential services like groceries.

In response to the rapid spread of the Omicron variant, the Government delayed the planned reopening of the country's border to February 2022, boosted pre-departure test requirements, and extended the stay at managed isolation and quarantine (MIQ) facilities by ten days.

On 3 February 2022, Ardern announced a five-stage plan for reopening the country's borders:

1. From 11.59pm on 27 February, New Zealanders and other eligible travellers from Australia would be allowed to self-isolate for ten days.
2. From 11.59pm on 13 March, New Zealanders and other eligible overseas travellers including skilled workers and working holiday visa holders would be allowed to self-isolate for seven days.
3. From 11.59pm, 12 April, most temporary visa holders, 5,000 international students and critical workers would be allowed to self isolate for seven days.
4. From July 2022, anyone from Australia, visa-waver travellers, and skilled workers would be allowed to enter the country without having to isolate.
5. From October 2022, the border would be opened to all visa holders.

Under this arrangement, vaccinated New Zealanders and eligible travellers would be able to go into self-isolation and undergo testing on arrival rather than having to go into MIQ facilities. Unvaccinated travellers would still be required to go into MIQ facilities.

On 28 February 2022, the New Zealand Government further accelerated the reopening of the country's borders:

1. From 11:59 pm on 2 March, vaccinated travellers would no longer need to self-isolate.
2. From 11:59 pm on 4 March, New Zealanders and other eligible critical workers would be able to enter the country without self-isolating.
3. From 13 March, most temporary visa holder categories including working holiday visa and seasonal workers would no longer need to self-isolate.

On 3 May 2022, the Government eased travel restrictions to allow unvaccinated visa holders, permanent residents, and Australian citizens residing in New Zealand to enter the country without undergoing managed isolation. In mid-May, the Government accelerated the reopening of New Zealand's borders:

1. From 16 May, visitors from the Pacific Islands can apply for visitor visas.
2. From 4 July, all work visas can enter the country.
3. From 31 July, all visitor and student visa holders and cruise ships can enter the country.

=== International responses ===
On 8 September 2020, the Secretary-General of the World Health Organization Tedros Adhanom praised New Zealand's response to the COVID-19 pandemic alongside several other countries including Cambodia, Japan, South Korea, Rwanda, Senegal, Spain, and Vietnam.

On 28 October, Hoover Institution senior fellow Victor Davis Hanson criticised Prime Minister Ardern's requirement that people undergoing managed isolation quarantine be tested as a condition for leaving on Fox News's The Ingraham Angle while the show's host Laura Ingraham likened MIQ facilities to coronavirus "quarantine camps". Hanson and Ingraham drew coverage from New Zealand media commentators including The Spinoff's Alex Braee, who compared their remarks to former United Kingdom Independence Party politician Suzanne Evans' remarks likening New Zealand's lockdown policies to Nazi Germany. Newshub's Jamie Ensor responded that Ingraham's comments lacked context, explaining that the camps were actually lavish hotels and motels.

== Court rulings ==
On 4 May 2020, a High Court judge allowed a man who had travelled from the United Kingdom to visit his dying father, overruling the Government's strict lockdown orders including a 14-day quarantine period for all overseas travellers. In response, Prime Minister Ardern asked Health Minister David Clark to review 24 cases where health authorities blocked requests by individuals to see their dying relatives on health grounds. As a result of the Government's review, a woman was granted exemption from the mandatory 14-day quarantine to visit her 59 year old terminally ill mother.

On 19 August, the Wellington High Court ruled that the Government's message to stay at home at the start of the Alert Level 4 lockdown for nine days between 26 March and 3 April was justified but unlawful and contrary to the New Zealand Bill of Rights Act 1990. A law change on 3 April made the lockdown legal. The High Court's ruling had come in response to a legal challenge mounted by lawyer Andrew Borrowdale. The Attorney General David Parker has defended the Government's handling of the lockdown and not ruled out an appeal against the ruling.

== Vaccination efforts ==
On 12 October 2020, the New Zealand Government signed an agreement with Pfizer and BioNTech to buy 1.5 million COVID-19 batches of the Pfizer-BioNTech COVID-19 vaccine. In addition, the Government established a fund of $66.3 million to support a COVID-19 immunisation programme.

On 3 February 2021, the Government formally authorised the Pfizer-BioNTech COVID-19 vaccine for use in New Zealand. The vaccine will be limited to people aged 16 years and over. On 20 February 100 nurses became the first people in New Zealand to receive the Pfizer-BioNTech COVID-19 vaccine. Healthcare workers, essential workers and those most at risk will be vaccinated in the second quarter of the year. The general population will be vaccinated in the second half of the year.

On 16 October 2021 ("Super Saturday"), an all-day nationwide vaccination telethon ("vaxathon") was held, featuring celebrity guests and health professionals in a coordinated cross-platform broadcast. The event resulted in record-breaking vaccination numbers, with over 100,000 doses being given out by 3 pm.

=== Vaccine rollout ===
COVID-19 vaccine rollout plan
Order	Priority group	Number eligible (Approximated)	Doses administered as of 11:59 pm 26 October 2021	Status
Group 1
1a	Border/MIQ workforce	15,000	Dose 1: 66,767; Dose 2: 65,205	In progress
1b	Families and household contacts	40,000	Dose 1: 66,767; Dose 2: 65,205	In progress
Group 2
2a	Frontline healthcare workers (non-border) who could be exposed to COVID-19 while providing care	57,000	Dose 1: 661,231; Dose 2: 621,689	In progress
2b	Frontline healthcare workers who may expose vulnerable people to COVID-19	183,000	Dose 1: 661,231; Dose 2: 621,689	In progress
2b	At-risk people living in settings with a high risk of transmission or exposure to COVID-19 including: older people and people with relevant health conditions in the Counties Manukau District Health Board (DHB) district; people in long-term residential care where a high proportion of residents are at risk of severe health outcomes if they contract COVID-19 (such as aged residential care); and; older people living in a whānau environment and those they live with, as they face a similar risk to those in aged residential care. This group will be supported by Māori and Pacific providers, and an initial allocation of 40,000 courses will be provided to Māori and Pacific providers to distribute.	234,000	Dose 1: 661,231; Dose 2: 621,689	In progress
Group 3
3a	People aged 75+	317,000	Dose 1: 793,481; Dose 2: 746,741	In progress
3b	People aged 65+	432,000	Dose 1: 793,481; Dose 2: 746,741	In progress
3c	People with underlying health conditions or disabilities	730,000	Dose 1: 793,481; Dose 2: 746,741	In progress
Group 4
4	People aged 60 and over	2,000,000	Dose 1: 2,136,491; Dose 2: 1,585,195	In progress
4	People aged 55 and over	2,000,000	Dose 1: 2,136,491; Dose 2: 1,585,195	In progress
4	People aged 50 and over	2,000,000	Dose 1: 2,136,491; Dose 2: 1,585,195	In progress
4	People aged 40 and over	2,000,000	Dose 1: 2,136,491; Dose 2: 1,585,195	In progress
4	People aged 30 and over	2,000,000	Dose 1: 2,136,491; Dose 2: 1,585,195	In progress
4	People aged 12 and over	2,000,000	Dose 1: 2,136,491; Dose 2: 1,585,195	In progress
Other groups
–	New Zealand Olympic Team	220	Dose 1: 220; Dose 2: 220	Completed
–	New Zealand Paralympic Team	29	Dose 1: 29; Dose 2: 29	Completed
–	Special forces in Operation Kōkako	80	Dose 1: 80; Dose 2: 80	Completed

The following reasons for overseas travel are eligible to be considered for an early vaccine:

- access critical medical care that is not available in New Zealand for yourself or your dependent
- to visit an immediate family member who is dying
- to provide critical care and protection for a dependent e.g., your child.
- to protect the safety and security of New Zealand's right to govern itself
- for Government-approved humanitarian efforts as part of New Zealand's commitments to foreign aid, international disaster responses, or supporting Pacific and Realm countries' recovery from the COVID-19 pandemic
- to participate in major international events where travel is necessary to represent New Zealand
- for nationally significant trade negotiations.

== Public opinion ==
=== Government response approval ===
An Utting Research poll conducted on 1–2 March 2020 found that 47% of respondents were satisfied with the government's overall response to the COVID-19 outbreak, with 34% unsatisfied and 19% unsure. A subsequent poll conducted on 21–22 March, prior to the lockdown announcement, found that 62% of respondents were satisfied with the response. However, 37% were not confident a large-scale outbreak could be prevented in New Zealand, with 26% confident and 36% unsure.

A Newshub–Reid Research poll conducted from 8 to 16 May 2020 asked whether it was "the right call" to implement the March–April nationwide Level 4 stay-at-home order. 91.6% responded "yes", 6% "no" and 2.5% "don't know".

On 9 August 2020, a Horizon Research poll found that trust in the Ministry of Health and Government's ability to manage the COVID-19 pandemic was 82%, down from 91% in April 2020. The poll also found that 64% of New Zealanders still "totally" trusted the Government and Ministry of Health, down from 75% in April.

A poll by Stickybeak for The Spinoff on 16–17 February 2021 found that 79% of people rated the government's response as "excellent" or "good" overall while 12% of people rated it "bad" or "terrible". Similarly, 79% of people approved of the decision to move Auckland to Alert Level 3 on 14 February while 12% opposed, and 67% supported moving the rest of the country to Level 2 while 19% opposed.

An 18–22 August 2021 poll by Stickybeak for the Spinoff found that 84% of people supported the decision to move to Alert Level 4 on 17 August, with 10% opposed. Of the 84%, 72% of people strongly supported the decision. Overall, 79% of people supported the government's response to the virus while 12% opposed; these values are unchanged from their February poll.

In early August the New Zealand government locked down the country in an attempt to stop the Delta Variant, while initially supportive of the governments response, public opinion declined significantly as the lockdown continued and the government initially refused to give up on its elimination strategy. An October poll found In November 2021, polling showed that support for both the government and trust in its response had dropped in-part due to the ongoing lockdown to stop the Delta Variant.

Between 17 and 28 November 2022, The New Zealand Herald commissioned two polls by polling company Dynata, which both surveyed a thousand people. The first survey found that 51% of respondents thought that New Zealand's COVID-19 response had divided the country while 37% thought that the COVID-19 response had unified the country. The second survey found that 57% of respondents thought that New Zealand's response to COVID-19 had been "well-judged and appropriate." By contrast, 25% disagreed while 18% were undecided on the matter.

==== Jacinda Ardern resignation ====
Despite early approval of her handling of the pandemic, the slow rollout of vaccines, continued COVID-19 restrictions and a host of non-COVID-19 related issues in New Zealand helped create strong opposition, particularly in far-right groups, to Ardern's prime ministership. While she remained popular internationally, her resignation in January 2023 came amid fading popularity at home.

Government response approval ratings
Date	Polling organisation	Sample size	Approve	Disapprove	Unsure	Lead
17–28 November 2022	The New Zealand Herald-Dynata	1,000	57	25	18	27
29 Oct-3 Nov 2021	Talbot Mills Research	1,023	46	26	28	20
28 Sept-5 Oct 2021	Talbot Mills Research	1,200	60	16	24	44
18–22 Aug 2021	The Spinoff–Stickybeak		79	12	11	57
16–17 Feb 2021	The Spinoff–Stickybeak	601	79	12	10	57
14–19 Jul 2020	Horizon Poll	1,762	82	17	1	65
16–20 May 2020	Colmar Brunton	1,003	92	7	2	85
20–21 April 2020	Colmar Brunton	601	87	8	5	79
3–5 April 2020	Colmar Brunton	601	84	9	6	75
21–22 March 2020	Utting Research/Stuff	3,133	62	22	16	40
1–2 March 2020	Utting Research/Stuff	1,900	47	37	16	10
8–12 February 2020	Colmar Brunton	1,004	62	25	12	37

=== Vaccine mandates ===
An October 2021 Talbot Mills poll found that support for workplace vaccine mandates was at 79% for health workers, 76% for people travelling overseas, 72% for teachers, 71% for hospitality workers, and 70% for supermarket staff and domestic travellers. A November 2021 1 News–Colmar Brunton poll found that 74% of respondents supported the workplace vaccine mandates currently in place, with 20% opposed.

=== Media perception ===
The New Zealand Government's response to the COVID-19 pandemic was covered by both national and international media, which praised Prime Minister Jacinda Ardern's leadership and swift response to the outbreak. The Washington Post's Fifield described her regular use of interviews, press conferences and social media as a "masterclass in crisis communication." In addition, Alastair Campbell, a journalist and adviser in Tony Blair's British government, commended Ardern for addressing both the human and economic consequences of the coronavirus pandemic. Following the 2020 New Zealand general election, The Observer's Roy and Graham-McLay attributed the Sixth Labour Government's landslide election victory to Ardern's "deft handling" of the COVID-19 pandemic and "resolute belief" in science and experts.

Due to the large viewing of the daily 1 pm press briefings, the actions of and lines of questioning from journalists came under scrutiny from the public, with many criticising repetitive or aggressive lines of questioning and "gotcha" accusations. Stuff journalist Thomas Coughlan replied that the criticism "seemed to come from nowhere" and these actions are "really the way it's always been", saying that the methodology has only come into question due to the large viewership of the press conferences. Television producer Robyn Patterson, writing for Newsroom, commented that the "aggressive stance of some local journalists ... is leading to a public backlash", which "elevates the anxiety levels of an already distressed public and creates deep unease". She noted that a 2019 Griffith University study of journalistic best practice recommended that journalists consider the needs of those impacted by disastrous events or else they risk causing more harm than good.

In late April 2021, Bloomberg's COVID Resilience Ranking ranked New Zealand as the second best place to be during the COVID-19 pandemic, giving a score of 79.6. Slower vaccination rates had caused the country to drop in the ranking by 0.1 points. Singapore ranked first at that time in the COVID Resilience Ranking, with a score of 79.7.

== Restriction levels ==
=== Alert level system ===
Between March 2020 and December 2021, New Zealand operated on a four-tier alert level system, with levels 3 and 4 being forms of lockdown. In level 1 there are no domestic restrictions; in level 2 there are limits on gatherings; in level 3 only purposeful travel is allowed and there are strict limits on gatherings; and in level 4 only essential travel is allowed and gatherings are banned.

=== Traffic light system ===
On 15 October 2021, Ardern announced that the alert level system would soon be dropped in favour of a "traffic light" system, officially called the COVID-19 Protection Framework. This three-tier system uses vaccination rates to determine the level of restrictions needed. She initially stated that the system would be adopted nationwide once all DHBs reach the milestone of 90% of the eligible population being fully vaccinated and will occur in the Auckland Region once its three DHBs achieve 90%. However, on 22 November, Ardern stated that the 90% target would not have to be met, confirming that New Zealand would enter the "traffic light system" on 3 December, replacing the previous alert level system. Auckland and areas with low vaccination start on the Red setting while the rest of the country starts on the Orange setting.

The three levels are Red when the health care system is at risk of being overloaded, Orange when there is pressure on the health care system, and Green when hospitalisation levels are manageable.

=== Support bubble ===
The support-bubble concept

Early in the pandemic, the government launched the "support bubble" concept. A bubble is defined as a group of people with whom one has close physical contact. People in a bubble do not have to practise social distancing from one another. The entire bubble counts as one household.

== Long-term effects ==
In April 2020, the New Zealand Treasury projected that the country could experience an unemployment rate of 13.5% if the country remained in lockdown for four weeks, with a range of between 17.5% and 26% if the lockdown was extended. Prior to the lockdown, the unemployment rate was at 4.2%. Finance Minister Grant Robertson vowed that the Government would keep the unemployment rate below 10%.

In the second quarter of 2020, unemployment fell 0.2 percentage points to 4 percent; however, the under-utilisation rate (a measure of spare capacity in the labour market) rose to a record 12 percent, up 1.6 percentage points from the previous quarter, and working hours fell by 10 percent.

National GDP contracted 1.6% in the first quarter of 2020. The country officially entered a recession in September after Statistics New Zealand reported a GDP contraction of 12.2% in the second quarter of 2020. The second-quarter contraction was led by a 47.4% contraction in accommodation and food and beverage services, a 38.7% contraction in transport, postal and warehousing, and a 25.8% contraction in construction. GDP rebounded 14.0% in the third quarter of 2020.

On 3 November 2021, Statistics New Zealand reported that the unemployment rate had dropped to 3.4% despite the effects of COVID-19, the lowest rate recorded since the organisation started reporting it.

On 15 April 2024, the University of Washington's latest Global Burden of Disease study reported that the all-age mortality rate between 2020 and 2021 was negative in New Zealand and six other countries including Taiwan, Mongolia, Japan, Iceland, Antigua and Barbuda, and Barbados. In 2021, New Zealand and Barbados were the only two countries with negative excess mortality. University of Otago epidemiologist Professor Michael Baker credited New Zealand's initial elimination strategy with keeping Covid numbers down until vaccines became widely available. In 2022, the death toll rose by 10.2% compared with the previous year due to the relaxation of pandemic restrictions and the concurrent outbreak of the Omicron variant, reaching 6,000 by 2024.

On 6 September 2024, the New Zealand Medical Journal published a study of 5.2m vaccinations in New Zealand, which reported that local vaccine effectiveness against COVID-19 hospitalisation was 69.6% (95% CI: 50.1–81.5) in the first month after vaccination and increased to 88.5% (95% CI: 80.6–93.1) in the second month. Against death, there was sustained protection over the follow-up period, with effectiveness of 87.6% (95% CI: 38.9–97.5).

On 12 February 2025, a University of Auckland report, entitled Pacific contribution to the New Zealand COVID-19 response - Strengths, Weaknesses and Missed Opportunities by Professor Collin Tukuitonga, found that Pasifika and Māori people had a disproportionately higher COVID-19 death toll compared with other ethnic groups in New Zealand due to poorer living conditions, access to services and lower incomes.

== Post-pandemic ==
New Zealand entered a recession in mid-2023 in part due to the fallout of the COVID-19 pandemic. In July 2023 a Royal Commission into the handling of the pandemic was announced.

The Royal Commission released its first phase report on 28 November 2024. While the report concluded that the use of lockdowns and vaccine mandates had helped curb the spread of COVID-19, the report concluded that these policies along with misinformation and disinformation had eroded social cohesion and trust in the Government's pandemic response. The report also concluded that the repeated lockdowns in Auckland had "cumulative and multifaceted" impacts on the local economy, physical and mental health, and certain demographics such as Māori, Pasifika, lower income people, and Auckland students. The report credited efforts by Māori and other community groups with alleviating some of the "potential negative impacts" of the lockdown.

== Testing ==
=== Requirements ===
In early March 2020, there were concerns about COVID-19 tests being given only to people with symptoms who had returned from impacted countries or people who had been in contact with a confirmed case. Some people with symptoms but who did not fit these categories were not tested. In April the New Zealand Microbiology Network recommended that transfers into or between aged care providers should not be tested, a position they maintained despite an outbreak in care facilities and calls for screening tests from E Tū union and the Aged Care Association.

The case definition for qualifying for a COVID-19 test is having "any acute respiratory infection with at least one of the following symptoms: cough, sore throat, shortness of breath, coryza, [or] anosmia with or without fever."

The previous case definition for testing from 14 March to 3 April was meeting at least one of the following criteria:

- symptoms (fever or cough or shortness of breath or sore throat) and travel history
- symptoms (fever or cough or shortness of breath or sore throat) and close or casual contact with a suspect, probable or confirmed case
- healthcare workers with pneumonia
- people treated in intensive care units for severe respiratory illnesses

For cases not fitting this case definition doctors are encouraged to use their own judgement whether to test the patient or not.

On 18 August, Newshub reported that a senior quarantine official had revealed that quarantine workers had requested a regular testing "regime" multiple times but their concerns were ignored. While Prime Minister Ardern had initially claimed that some workers were reluctant, Health Minister Chris Hipkins acknowledged that he was aware that the testing of border staff was incomplete during a briefing, stating that "they should not have been declined tests." Opposition Leader Judith Collins criticised the Government's handling of the issue.

On 9 July 2021, COVID-19 Response Minister Chris Hipkins admitted that half of pre-departure tests were checked due to "capacity constraints." Stuff had reported that more than 20 people had arrived in the country from Australia without the mandated pre-departure test including one who had recently visited New South Wales.

On 26 August 2021, community health provider Whānau Waipareira began rolling out saliva testing among its 250 staff in Auckland and Wellington. The group's chief executive officer John Tamihere also confirmed that there were plans to extend them to the public as an alternative to the more common nasal swab tests being used by health providers.

In early September 2021, Director General of Health Ashley Bloomfield confirmed that the Government had plans to expand saliva testing at Auckland's Level 4 border crossing following months of delays in rolling out the service to border and essential workers. This announcement followed Yale University research scientist and saliva testing advocate Anne Wyllie's criticism of the saliva testing provider Asia Pacific Healthcare Group's testing methods.

By 28 February 2022, the Health Ministry confirmed that New Zealand has received 14 million rapid antigen test (RATS) kits. These kits will be shipped to community testing centres, general practitioners, and pharmacies right across New Zealand. Associate Health Minister Ayesha Verrall also confirmed that the Government had ordered 180 million RATS kits for the next six months.

=== Results ===
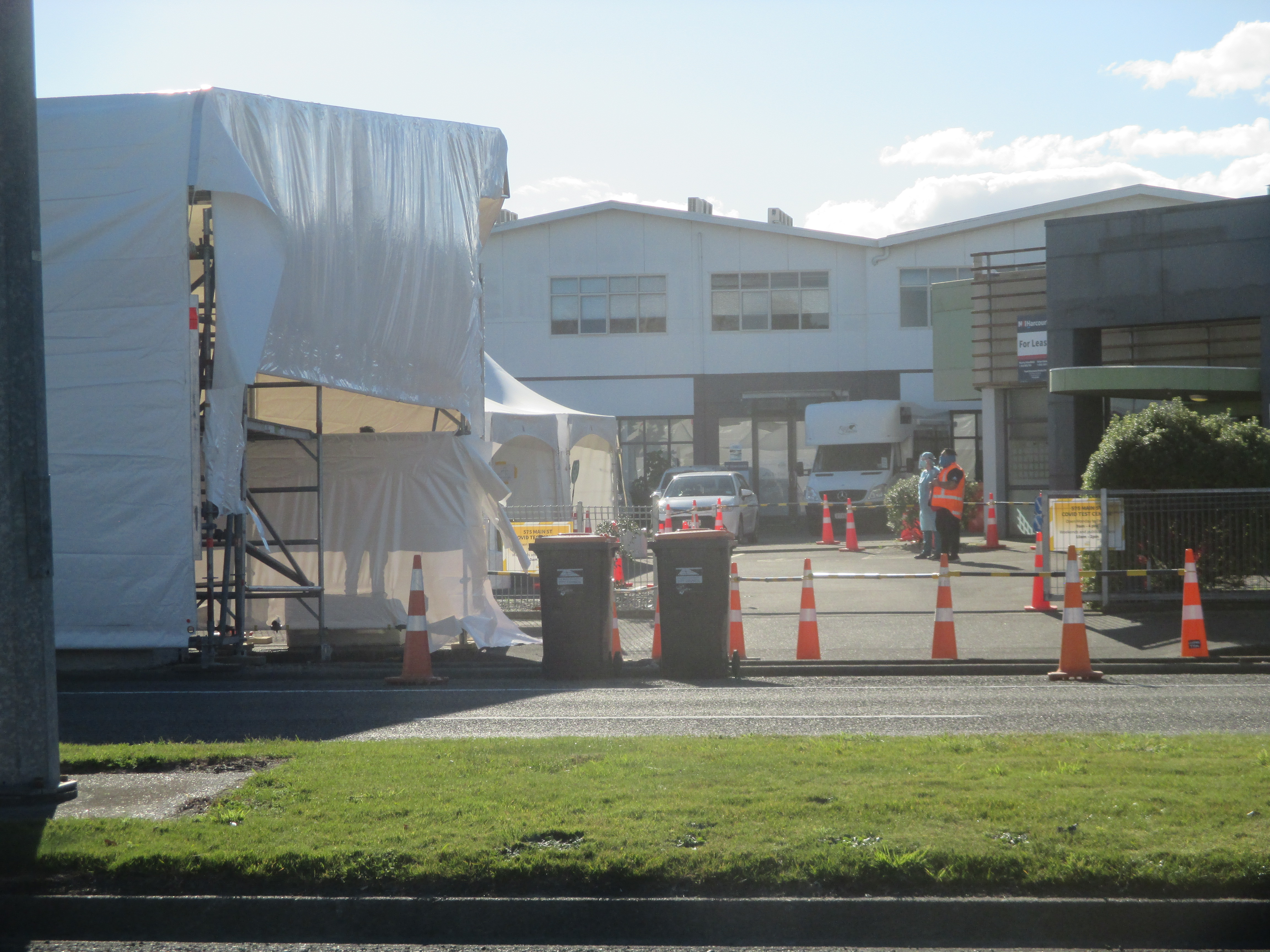
COVID-19 testing centre in Palmerston North

As of 21 November 2021: there have been 4,664,080 tests completed in total, including 401,966 tests in managed isolation facilities, with a positivity rate of 0.21%. The ethnic group with the highest rate of testing was Pacific, with a rate of 170.2 tests per 100 people, followed by Asian with 97.1, Māori with 83.1 per 100, and finally European/MELAA/Other with 80.4 per 100, (Note: The testing data is reported with prioritised ethnicity. If a person has multiple ethnicities, they are reported only as a single ethnicity with the following order of precedence: Māori, Pacific, Asian, Middle Eastern/Latin American/African, Other, European. This is in contrast to total response ethnicity, where a person with multiple ethnicities is reported under all ethnic groups they identify with.) out of 4,664,080 people in total, or the equivalent of 91% of the New Zealand population of 5,126,300.

Starting from 16 April 2020, random voluntary community testing took place in select supermarkets around the country to provide information on whether there still existed community transmission of the virus. This testing resulted in no positive results out of 1000 people by 20 April.

On 19 March 2021, Newshub reported that scientists had traced two COVID-19 cases who had tested positive following their stay in managed isolation to unventilated spaces in the doorway of their hotel corridor at their managed isolation facility in Christchurch.

== Statistics ==
=== Cases ===
During the pandemic New Zealand had 2,274,370 cases (2,217,047 confirmed and 57,323 probable cases) of COVID-19 (up to 3 April 2023). Based on the national population estimate of 4,966,000 this gives the country 422,409.6 confirmed cases per million population (430,679.4 confirmed and probable cases per million population).

Confirmed and probable COVID-19 cases by gender as of 3 April 2023.
1. Female (54.6%)
2. Male (45.3%)
3. Unknown (0.10%)
Confirmed and probable COVID-19 cases by ethnicity as of 3 April 2023.
1. Māori (14.7%)
2. Pacific (8.08%)
3. Asian (14.5%)
4. MELAA (1.76%)
5. European or other (60.2%)
6. Unknown (0.67%)

Broken down by district health board (DHB) as of 3 April 2023:

DHB	Cases			
DHB	Total	Deaths	Recoveries	Active
Auckland	216,385	178	215,242	965
Bay of Plenty	101,507	130	100,907	470
Canterbury	297,169	379	294,543	2,247
Capital & Coast	159,401	121	158,403	877
Counties Manukau	259,929	208	258,869	1,032
Hawke's Bay	77,734	126	76,140	280
Hutt Valley	77,140	77	77,642	386
Lakes	45,616	77	45,318	221
MidCentral	83,433	148	82,859	426
Nelson Marlborough	67,974	93	67,427	454
Northland	70,066	91	69,665	310
South Canterbury	29,420	31	29,181	208
Southern	165,568	220	164,133	1,215
Tairāwhiti	23,162	30	23,033	99
Taranaki	56,820	104	56,341	375
Unknown	1,804	3	1,766	35
Waikato	179,815	264	178,664	887
Wairarapa	21,950	49	21,782	119
Waitematā	268,274	279	266,731	1,264
West Coast	13,794	15	13,609	167
Whanganui	29,746	58	29,551	137
At the Border	27,295	6	27,289	0
New Zealand	2,274,370	2,687	2,259,509	12,174

Cases have been reported in the Chatham Islands and in New Zealand's associated states (536 in Cook Islands, 1 in Niue).

No cases have been reported in the dependent territory of Tokelau and it is the last country or dependency to have no confirmed infections from the disease.

During the lockdown, overall weekly deaths declined in New Zealand compared to previous years. The decline is thought to be linked to a reduction in deaths from traffic collisions, air pollution, work injuries, respiratory tract infections, and elective surgery.

=== Clusters ===
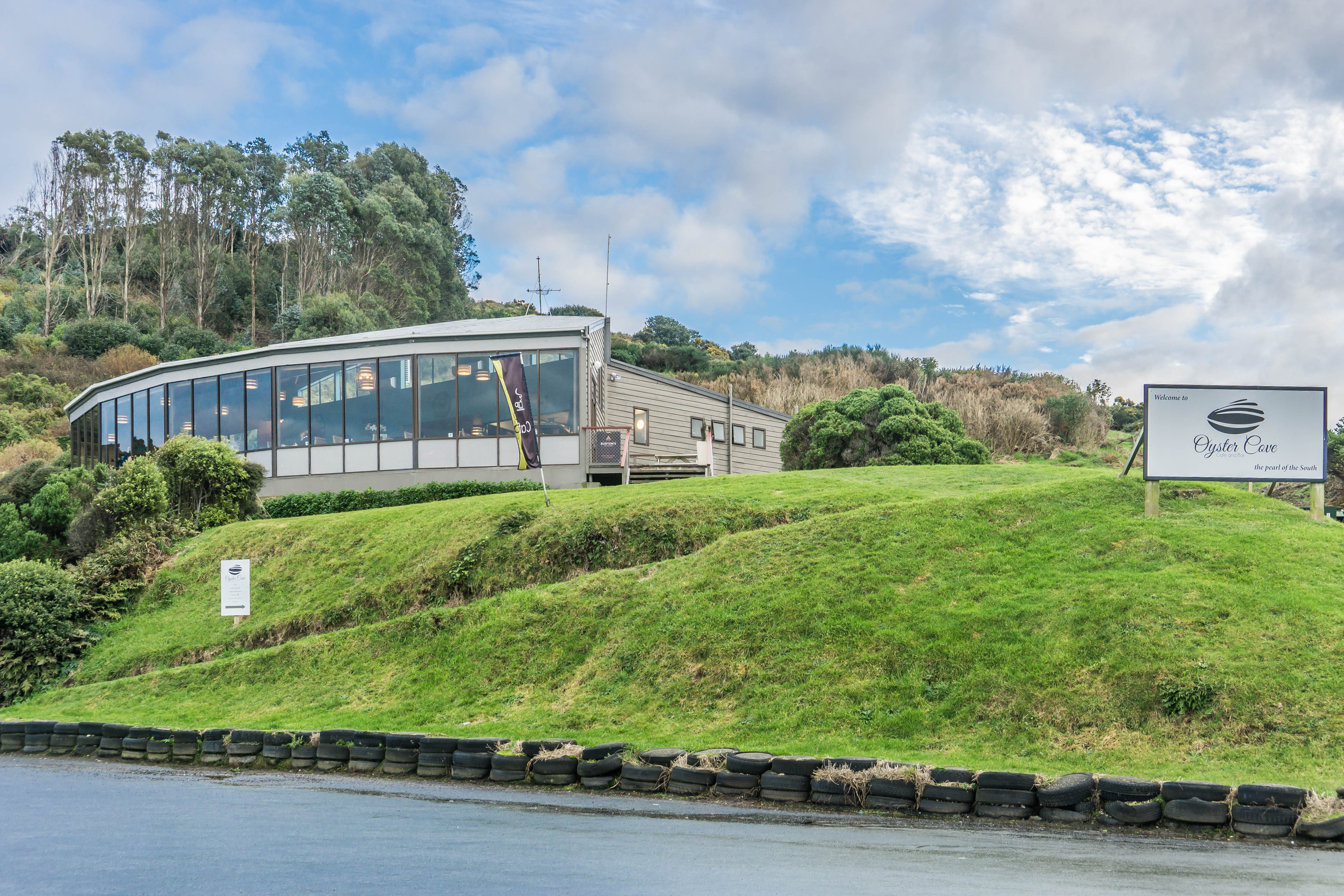
Oyster Cove, the venue of the Bluff wedding at Stirling Point

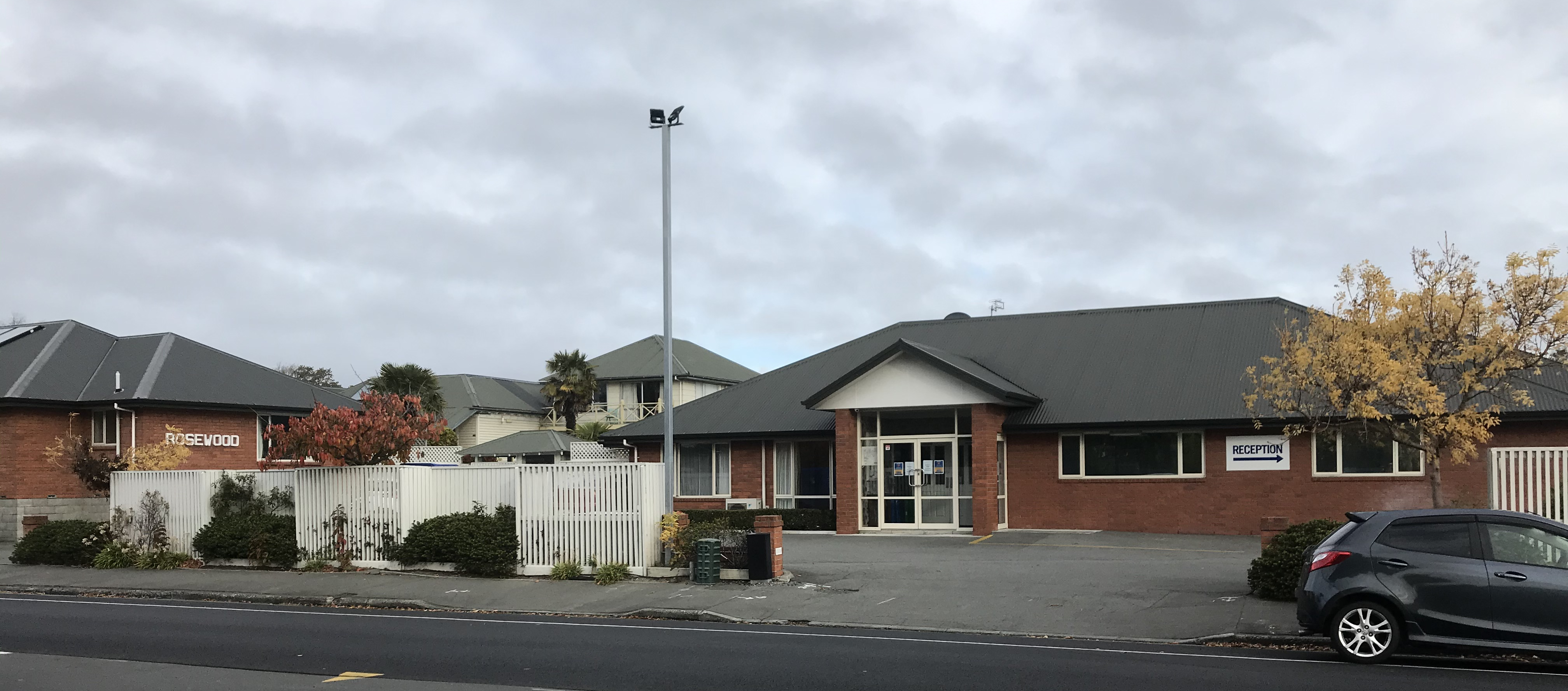
Rosewood Rest Home in Christchurch, the cluster with the greatest number of deaths

During the elimination phase of the pandemic, outbreaks were traced and consolidated into various clusters, most of which were contained entirely.

The following clusters have been closed. A cluster is considered closed when there have been no new cases for two incubation periods (i.e. 28 days) from the date when all cases complete isolation.

- August 2021 Community, Auckland – 10,006
- Auckland August cluster, closed 3 November 2020 – 179
  - Mount Roskill Evangelical Fellowship church "mini cluster"
- Wedding, Bluff – 98
- Marist College, Auckland – 96
- Saint Patrick's Day gathering, Redoubt Bar, Matamata – 77
- Rosewood Rest Home, Christchurch – 56
- CHT St Margarets rest home, Auckland – 51
- Private function, Auckland – 40
- World Hereford Conference, Queenstown – 39
- International Mariners, Christchurch – 33
- Community group, Auckland – 30
- Ruby Princess cruise ship, Hawke's Bay – 24
- George Manning Lifecare rest home, Christchurch – 19
- Viking Bay Vessel, Wellington – 18
- Group travel to the United States, Wellington – 16
- Group travel to the United States, Auckland – 16
- Lyttelton Mariner – 16
- Atawhai Assisi rest home, Hamilton – 15
- Auckland February cluster – 15
- Mattina Vessel, Invercargill – 15
- Community group, Christchurch – 14
- Wedding, Wellington – 13
- Rest home, Auckland – 13
- Rio De La Plata Vessel, Tauranga – 11

All 12 of the first wave (pre-2022) of Canterbury DHB deaths were cases within the Rosewood Rest Home cluster. This cluster accounted for nearly one quarter of the country's total death toll from COVID-19 prior to 2022.

=== Progression of COVID-19 ===
Progression of COVID-19 cases in New Zealand, March 2020 – November 2021:

As of 30 November 2021:

View source data.

Cases Recovered Hospitalised Deaths Active Cases (Note: The number of active cases is the number of total confirmed and probable cases minus the number of recoveries and deaths.)

The March–June 2020 part of the same graph in semi-log plot form:

As of 30 June 2020:

View source data.

Cases Recovered Hospitalised Deaths Active Cases

=== New cases and fatalities ===
New COVID-19 cases (confirmed and probable) and deaths in New Zealand:

==== New cases per day ====
===== 2020 =====
View source data.

===== 2021 =====
View source data.

===== 2022 =====
As of 24 July 2022:

View source data.

As of 24 July 2022, in semi-log form:

View source data.

==== New deaths per day ====
As of 24 July 2022: (Note: The definition of a COVID-19-related death changed on 10 March 2022, hence the high peak.)

View source data.

=== Deaths ===
As of October 2023, over 3,000 people have died due to COVID-19. A paper published in 2023 in The New Zealand Medical Journal wrote that if New Zealand had the same mortality rate as the United States, around 20,000 more people would have died. The report said that New Zealand's success was caused by controlling the virus for two years until most of the population could be vaccinated, and that the country's health system was ready.

== See also ==
- Timeline of the COVID-19 pandemic in New Zealand
- My Vaccine Pass
- COVID-19 pandemic by country
- COVID-19 pandemic in Oceania
- COVID-19 pandemic in Australia
- COVID-19 pandemic in the Cook Islands
