= Jemma Geoghegan =

Scottish-born evolutionary virologist in New Zealand

- Born: 1985 or 1986 (age 39–40); Cupar, Fife, Scotland
- Education: University of Otago
- Known for: Research on: Evolutionary biology; Virology; Infectious diseases; Metagenomics
- Scientific career
- Fields: Genome sequencing
- Workplaces: Macquarie University; University of Otago
- Thesis: Modelling selection under soft inheritance (2012)
- Doctoral advisor: Hamish Spencer

Jemma Louise Geoghegan (born 1985 or 1986) is a Scottish-born evolutionary virologist, based at the University of Otago, New Zealand, who specialises in researching emerging infectious diseases and the use of metagenomics to trace the evolution of viruses. As a leader in several government-funded research projects, Geoghegan became the public face of genomic sequencing during New Zealand's response to COVID-19. Her research has contributed to the discussion about the likely cause of COVID-19 and the challenges around predicting pandemics. She was a recipient of the Young Tall Poppy Award in 2017, a Rutherford Discovery Fellowship in 2020, and the 2021 Prime Minister's Emerging Scientist Prize.

== Early life and education ==
Geoghegan was born and raised in Cupar, Scotland. She was accepted into the University of Strathclyde, Glasgow, but in 2004 took a year off school before starting her university studies to work as a volunteer teacher in Baddegama, Sri Lanka. At the age of 18, she returned to the University of Strathclyde and completed her Bachelor of Science (Honours) in Genetics, specialising in Forensic Biology in 2009. She received a scholarship to do a doctorate at the University of Otago and moved to New Zealand. She was offered the opportunity to do the PhD by Professor Hamish Spencer, who said he "chose Geoghegan for the post because of her 'interesting' background." On completion of her PhD in evolutionary biology in 2012, Geoghegan went to New York where she worked with a group at New York University that was focused on HIV. In 2013 she moved to Australia and worked as a postdoctoral research fellow at the University of Sydney from 2013 to 2017, before getting her own laboratory at Macquarie University.

== Career ==
Geoghegan worked as a lecturer at Macquarie University from 2017 to 2020. In 2017 for her research as an evolutionary biologist, she received the Tall Young Poppy Award.

Since 2020 Geoghegan has been a senior lecturer in the University of Otago's microbiology and immunology department and an associate senior scientist at the Institute of Environmental Science and Research (ESR). In August 2023 she was promoted to the Webster Family Chair in Viral Pathogenesis at Otago.

== Genome sequencing ==
=== Public profile ===
Geoghegan has been described as one of New Zealand's "standout communicators... one of the faces of this country's COVID-19 genome sequencing efforts." Writing in The Spinoff, the New Zealand-based scientist Siouxsie Wiles acknowledged Geoghegan as "one of the people behind New Zealand's incredible efforts to sequence all the strains of the virus we get here." Wiles also recommended that those interested in learning more about genome sequencing should check out research being developed by a team that included Geoghegan. The paper for this research was later published on 11 December 2020. The Guardian acknowledged Geoghegan as "one of the scientists leading work to analyse genomic sequences of the virus."

When Britain decided in July 2021 to lift all public health restrictions following lockdowns during COVID-19 despite only half of the population being vaccinated, Geoghegan shared the concerns of Siouxsie Wiles, Ashley Bloomfield and Julie Anne Genter that this was likely to lead to more dangerous virus variants circulating worldwide, undermining vaccination programmes. She said this was "[training] the virus to escape vaccine-induced immunity", and the country needed a higher threshold of vaccination to deal with the Delta variant.

In January 2022 as the Omicron variant began circulating New Zealand and it appeared that there would be a further mutation, BA.2, Geoghegan noted that "the new mutation is largely found through genome sequencing as only certain types of PCR (nasal swab) tests pick up the subtle differences between Delta and BA.2...[but that]...people who are fully vaccinated with boosters were "effectively protected" against the new variant. By June 2022 it was widely held that Omicron would likely become endemic in New Zealand. Considering the implications of this, one commentator wrote, "the only determinants of how many people will be sickened, disabled or killed by the virus are its evolutionary leaps and our actions to shape its environment." Geoghegan agreed that the host and the virus are in an "evolutionary arms race where they keep changing to try and beat each other", but noted it is difficult to predict how the virus could change as new variants attempt to evade immunity from vaccination or prior infection. She said factors such as "rapidly replicating and infecting cells inside a chronic, immunocompromised person...[or]...a recombination of different variants, perhaps in an animal host" could affect this.

=== Debate on the causes of COVID-19 ===
In early 2020, when questions were being asked about the causes of the coronavirus pandemic, Geoghegan was asked on 7 News, as a scientist whose "expertise focuses on the area where animals and humans meet", if and how COVID-19 had jumped from animals to humans. She explained that bats do contain viruses similar to COVID-19, but to confirm they were "genetically related", it was necessary to look at the "genetic signatures" in the virus. In 2018 Geoghegan had participated in a research study that used a metagenomics lens to show by examination of the genome sequencing of viruses in fish as the ancestors of all vertebrates, how a virus can spread and evolve through time and space, confirming it exists in nature and not necessarily made by humans. She has noted that the genome of SARS-CoV-2, the virus that causes COVID-19, is closely related to other viruses that are present in nature and that as a new SARS virus, the coronavirus was likely to have taken a similar route to that which caused the SARS outbreak in 2003 when it was spread from live animals to humans. Geoghegan concluded, "human interactions with live animals make a host jump more likely to occur, and live animal markets are a massive source of these interactions."

=== Predicting viruses ===
Geoghegan published an article in the Australasian Science Journal (2016) that researched the role of biological factors such as the size, structure and mode of transmission of viruses in predicting their risk of being transmissible amongst humans. In the same year she collaborated on research with Edward Holmes that explores whether viruses could be predicted. When discussing the research with Ed Yong at The Atlantic, Geoghegan said prediction is difficult because of the vast number of viruses and supported the conclusions of another scientist, Kristian Anderson, from Scripps Research Institute when he said it was "simply impossible...[to predict]...whether a newly discovered animal virus could jump into humans and cause a pandemic." In the article, Geoghagen argued that it is best to identify "fault lines" where animals and people interact. Yong concluded: "The kind of surveillance that Geoghagen, Andersen, and others are calling for...[is]...vital." In May 2020, Geoghegan told The Sydney Morning Herald, that the best way to gain knowledge of possible prediction of viruses is to fund surveillance of people, particularly in places where they interact with live animals and identify the "risk zones" Introduced by Kate Hawkesby on Newstalk ZB as "an expert in genome sequencing", Geoghegan explained that when a virus jumps from person to person, it creates a new mutation that could be tracked in terms of origin and possible spread in the community.

=== Avian influenza ===
In August 2023, Geoghegan co-authored an article warning new strains of avian influenza (known as bird flu) were causing a worldwide panzootic amongst aquatic birds, with [increasingly common] "spillovers to non-avian hosts such as mammals". The article noted that as of 2023 there had been no cases of the variants in New Zealand, but cautioned the country was vulnerable because of the high number of migratory birds that come each year, some of which may experience asymptomatic infections. The authors noted that New Zealand had little surveillance of active viruses in wildlife and suggested a series of steps the country could take to be prepared for incursions. These would include raising awareness when there are unexpected deaths of animals, increasing targeting of known pathogens and maximising the use of the "viral genomics capabilities...established during COVID-19."

== Selected research projects ==
=== Institute of Environmental Science and Research ===
In May 2020 as a result of a collaboration between Otago University and the Institute of Environmental Science and Research (ESR), Geoghegan was allocated $600,000 from the Ministry of Business, Innovation and Employment (MBIE) COVID-19 Innovation Acceleration Fund. Her role was to lead an international team of scientists to sequence the genomes of all of New Zealand's positive COVID-19 cases and track how the virus spread across New Zealand. By August 2020, the team was able to show genomic sequencing confirming that the origin of the virus in New Zealand was from overseas, and was mostly spread within the country at social gatherings. When Auckland had another community outbreak of the virus in August 2020, Geoghegan told Kathryn Ryan on RNZ National that the work she was involved in with the ESR could identify which quarantine facility or border outpost the virus had originated from and compare the genomes of the new cases to the ones from the "managed-isolation facilities", or from around the world.

In a podcast Geoghegan explained how genome sequencing worked and that internationally the data gathered was being shared as a rapid response to COVID-19. Following the second outbreak of the virus in the New Zealand community in August 2020, Geoghegan said:

It is vital that genomics is part of this response to enable us to track where these cases may have arisen and to estimate the size and number of clusters present...[and]...by comparing the virus genomes from these cases to those from both the quarantine facilities and the global population, we can determine their likely origin and how long they have been circulating in the community.

In November 2020, when an aircrew member who had arrived in New Zealand from overseas tested positive, Geoghegan reiterated the importance of genome sequencing to establish whether the virus related to local or global infections and the likelihood that transmission of the cases occurred during the flight.

=== Rutherford Discovery Fellowship ===
On 22 October 2020, the Royal Society Te Aparangi announced that Geoghegan was awarded the government-funded Rutherford Discovery Fellowship. The $800,000 scholarship would fund Geoghegan's study, which was entitled Ecological barriers and drivers of virus emergence. Its aim was to show "how viruses evolve to make the jump to a new host species, by sequencing RNA from diverse animal species in New Zealand and analysing any viruses present". Geoghegan described this as significant in the context of the COVID-19 pandemic, and would be the "first study examining virus ecology and evolution of such magnitude in this country.

In 2021, Geoghegan's work continued and was focused initially on the UK virus variant that had broken out in New Zealand. She said that the variant did contain a "few mutations that were likely increasing the rate of transmission...[but]...the biggest driver of virus spread is a population that doesn't have any immunity, which is basically all of New Zealand."

== Awards ==
In 2017 Geoghegan gained The Young Tall Poppy Award run by the Australian Institute of Policy and Science (AIPS). Geoghegan said that she was very passionate about communicating research findings to the wider community and the award was an opportunity for her to become more skilled in this area.

Geoghegan received the Genetics Society of Australia Alan Wilton Award to recognise outstanding contributions to the field of genetics research by Australasian scientists early in their career in 2017.

In 2017 she won the Macquarie University Faculty of Science and Engineering Excellence in Early Career Research Prize.

In May 2022 Geoghegan was awarded the 2021 Prime Minister's Emerging Scientist prize, worth $200,000. In North & South magazine, Paul Gorman wrote that "hundreds, if not thousands, of New Zealanders are still alive thanks to Geoghegan and colleagues tracking outbreaks of the Delta variant during the elimination phase of the pandemic. Some contemporaries believe she has helped save millions of lives around the world due to people avoiding the virus." Geohegan acknowledged that by receiving the award she was challenging the stigma around women in science, and "planned to use the funds from the award to support further research and student training."
