= Río de la Plata (disambiguation) =

The Río de la Plata (River Plate) is a river estuary in Argentina and Uruguay.

Río de la Plata also may refer to:

== Political entities ==
- United Provinces of the Río de la Plata, a country in South America that existed between 1810 and 1831
- Viceroyalty of the Río de la Plata, an administrative district within the Spanish Empire
- Governorate of the Río de la Plata, an administrative district preceding the viceroyalty

== Geography and geology ==
- Río de la Plata Basin, the hydrographical area that covers parts of Argentina, Brazil, Bolivia, Paraguay and Uruguay
- Río de la Plata craton, one of the five cratons (ancient nuclei) of the South American continent
- Río de la Plata (Puerto Rico), a river in Puerto Rico
- La Plata River (San Juan River), in the United States

== Ships ==
- Rio de la Plata, a commercial C3-P&C cargo/passenger liner hull converted into the United States Navy escort carrier USS Charger
- Rio de la Plata (ship), a container ship built in 2008
- Spanish cruiser Río de la Plata, a Spanish Navy protected cruiser in commission from 1899 to 1931

== Other ==
- Río de la Plata Bank, a building by Antonio Palacios in Madrid, Spain

== See also ==
- River Plate (disambiguation)
- Platte River
