= Murders of Yuna and Minu Jo =

Child murders in New Zealand

In August 2022 the bodies of two children, Yuna and Minu Jo, were found in suitcases in Auckland, New Zealand. The suitcases were bought from the sale of an abandoned storage unit where the bodies were suspected to have been stored for several years. In September 2022, Hakyung Lee, the mother of the children, was arrested in South Korea. She was extradited to New Zealand and charged with the children's murder. Her trial started on 8 September 2025. Following a two-week trial, Lee was convicted of murdering her two children on 23 September 2025. She was sentenced to life imprisonment on 26 November 2025.

== Hakyung Lee ==
=== Early life and family ===
The defendant, Hakyung Lee, who was born Ji Eun Lee, is the mother of the two victims, who were subsequently identified as Minu and Yuna Jo in September 2023. Lee migrated with her family from South Korea to New Zealand in 1993 at the age of 13. Following the death of her father in 1998, Lee returned to Korea for her university education at the age of 18 years. After two years in South Korea, she subsequently returned to New Zealand to study hospitality and met her future husband Ian Jo at a church, where she also served as a Sunday school teacher. In 2006, the couple married. The couple lived in an apartment before moving to a house in West Auckland.

Lee's daughter, Yuna Jo, was born in September 2009 while her son Minu Jo was born in March 2012. The son Minu had a speech impediment caused by cleft palate. The couple settled in a house in Papatoetoe following the birth of their children. The children attended Papatoetoe South School. According to teacher Mary Robinson, the children were well-behaved. She described Lee and Ian Jo as "caring parents" who were interested in their children's education. While Jo worked as a supervisor at Auckland Airport, Lee became a homestay mother for their two children.

=== Husband's death and mental health deterioration ===
In November 2017, Ian Jo died from cancer. Lee was grief-stricken following her husband's death and did not inform her children that their father had died. In the months following Jo's death, Lee became suicidal, isolated and allegedly insane. Lee also told her mother that she wanted herself and her children to die with her late husband. In December 2017, Lee took her children on a two-month holiday in South Korea, staying at luxury hotels and spending NZ$32,000. In April 2018, Lee also stayed at a Hilton hotel in Taupō. In May 2018, Lee and her children travelled to the Gold Coast in Australia where they stayed at another Hilton hotel. In mid June 2018, Lee and her two children visited Queenstown in the South Island where they stayed at a Hilton hotel and visited several restaurants. The children were last seen by relatives on 26 April 2018.

=== Children's deaths ===
According to Stuff and Radio New Zealand, the children last logged into Minecraft on 27 June 2018, where they each gained trophies. Minu was later found wearing underwear with "Wednesday" written on it. Lee killed her children around late June 2018 by serving them juice mixed with the antidepressant drug Nortriptyline. The children did not awake from their sleep. Following their deaths, she wrapped and hid their bodies inside suitcases in a storage unit. Due to the condition of their remains, the pathologist was unable to determine whether the children died from the drug or were incapacitated by the drug, and killed by other means. While both the prosecution and defence agree that Lee caused her children's deaths, they disagree on whether she was insane at the time.

=== Relocation to Korea ===
Following her children's deaths, Lee attempted suicide. While Lee said that she later regretted her actions, she claimed that she believed that she was doing the right thing at the time. Due to self loathing and guilt stemming from killing her children, Lee changed her name from Ji Eun Lee to Hakyung Lee. She returned to South Korea on a business class flight in July 2018. According to Stuff, Lee also spent money on beauty treatments in order to start a new life in Korea. While in Korea, Lee went to a clinic where she was diagnosed with depression and prescribed medication. In 2021, Lee began dating a man whom she met via a dating app. Lee described this relationship as traumatic and alleged that the man assaulted her.

In mid-June 2022, Lee's mother Choon Ja Lee learnt from her pastor that her daughter was a patient at a psychiatric ward of a South Korean hospital. Lee's mother subsequently visited her daughter in Korea. During their visit, Lee did not disclose the whereabouts of her children but asked her mother to buy her contact lenses, clothes and a phone. Following her return to New Zealand, Lee's mother was contacted by police about the discovery of her grandchildren's remains.

== Discovery and investigation ==
On 11 August 2022, human remains were found in two suitcases in Moncrieff Ave, Clendon Park. The suitcases were bought by a family as part of a storage unit auction from Safe Store Papatoetoe. The family brought the suitcases home along with other household objects. They smelled something strange, opened one of the suitcase, discovered a body later identified as Minu Jo, then called the police. New Zealand Police confirmed the family who bought the suitcases were not connected to the children's deaths.

On 26 August, Police said the children may have been dead for up to four years. In late September 2023, interim name suppression of the children was lifted by Coroner Tania Tetitaha. Their names were Minu Jo, who was born in March 2012, and Yuna Jo, who was born in September 2009. At the time of their deaths, the children were aged about six and eight years respectively.

=== Arrest and extradition ===
On 22 August 2022, New Zealand Police confirmed that they were aware that the children's mother had returned to South Korea in 2018. On 15 September 2022 the arrest of the children's mother in Ulsan, South Korea was announced. New Zealand authorities commenced extradition proceedings through the South Korean court system. The woman was arrested by Korean police on suspicion of "crimes against humanity", and will face two murder charges in New Zealand.

In November 2022, the South Korean Minister of Justice Han Dong-hoon approved the suspect's extradition. Earlier, the Seoul High Court had approved the woman's extradition after she had granted written consent. On 29 November, the children's mother was extradited by South Korean authorities, who also submitted "significant pieces of evidence" to their New Zealand counterparts.

== Legal proceedings and trial ==
=== Pre-trial procedures ===
On 30 November 2022, the suspect appeared at the Manukau District Court in South Auckland where she entered no plea. She was remanded into custody and the identities of the suspect, her children, and an unidentified relative were suppressed. On 14 December, she pleaded not guilty and was remanded in custody. On 3 May 2023, during an administrative hearing she said "I'm going to prove my innocence". On 8 May, her lawyers argued for continued name suppression in the Court of Appeals.

On 19 July 2023, the suspect was identified as Hakyung Lee, the mother of the two children. The New Zealand Court of Appeal lifted name suppression, rejecting her lawyer Chris Wilkinson-Smith's argument that publishing her identity would result in extreme hardship, endanger her safety, and prejudice her ability to engage in court proceedings or medical assessments. Lee has denied murdering her children and has pleaded not guilty. On 25 September 2023, Coroner Tania Tetitaha lifted interim name suppression for the deceased children. In response to the lifting of name suppression, two New Zealand-based relatives applied to have their names and identifying details suppressed.

=== Arraignment ===
Lee's trial was scheduled to start on 29 April 2024, but for undisclosed legal reasons was postponed to 8 September 2025.

On 8 September 2025, Lee pleaded not guilty to two murder charges at the Auckland High Court. Justice Geoffrey Venning indicated that she would raise an insanity defence. She represented herself with the assistance of two court-appointed lawyers Lorraine Smith and Chris Wilkinson Smith. The Crown was represented by solicitor Natalie Walker and prosecutors Jay Tausi and Jong Kim.

=== Opening arguments ===
On 9 September, trial proceedings opened with both the Crown and defence delivering their opening addresses. Walker told the court that a toxicology test of the remains of Yuna and Minu Jo had concluded that the children had died "by homicide of unspecified means associated with an antidepressant drug." Walker also told the court that Lee had been prescribed 60 Nortriptyline tablets in August 2017 after telling her doctor that she was struggling with sleeping difficulties. While both the Crown and defence agreed that Lee had caused her children's deaths and placed their remains in the suitcases inside the storage units, Walker disputed the defence argument that Lee was insane during and after her children's deaths. Walker argued that the defendant knew what she was doing was wrong, citing her behaviour following their deaths including hiring a storage unit, hiding their bodies, changing her name and returning to South Korea in July 2018 on a business class flight. She said that the Crown would be presenting evidence extracted from the children's PlayStation.

During the defence opening address, stand-by defence counsel Lorraine Smith argued that Lee was insane when she killed her two children. She told the court that Lee was driven into insanity by the loss of her husband to cancer in November 2017. The defendant became suicidal and isolated over the following months and came to believe that it was best for Yuna and Mino to die rather than face an "an unhappy and parentless future." Smith also gave a brief background into Lee's biography.

=== Trial evidence ===
The Crown summoned several witnesses including "Safe Store" staff member Shi-Hui Cong (Tracey), the children's former teacher Mary Robertson, Lee's brother-in-law Jimmy Sae Wook Cho, Cho's wife Bo Ram Lim, Lee's friend Gina Min, New Zealand Institute for Public Health and Forensic Science forensic toxicologist Helen Poulsen, the family's doctor Doctor Rama Velalagan, and the nurses Lin Ni, Kayleen Palatchie, and Natalie Woodward. Other key witnesses included Lee's mother Choon Ja Lee, forensic accountant Andrew Yoon, South Korean Detective Sergeant Sung Kyu Hwang, Detective Sergeant Ryan Singleton and digital forensic analyst Damian Govender.

The defence's sole witness was the psychiatrist Dr. Yvette Kelly, who argued that Lee met the criteria of insanity under Section 23 of the Crimes Act 1961. Kelly told the court that the defendant had confessed to killing her children by serving them juice with the anti-depressant drug Nortriptyline but argued that the defendant was legally insane at the time of the killings. In response, the Crown's rebuttal witness, forensic psychiatrist Erik Monasterio, presented evidence showing that Lee did not display symptoms of schizophrenia.

=== Closing arguments ===
On 22 September, the court heard closing arguments from both the Crown and defence. Prosecutor Walker argued that Lee was not insane when she killed her children, citing her actions following their deaths including changing her name, accessing a storage facility, cleaning and vacating her rental property, and booking a business-class flight to South Korea. She also pointed out that Lee had told several lies to her family, police and doctors about her children's deaths. Walker also argued that Lee had lied about her suicide attempts. She also cited Monasterio's testimony that the defendant did not display symptoms of psychosis or indicate that she was unaware that her actions were morally wrong.

Defence stand-by counsel Smith told the court that Lee had been mentally unwell throughout her life and that her mental state had deteriorated following the death of her husband. Smith said that Lee had made three previous suicide attempts including one following her father's death when she was 18 years old. She argued that Lee's mental health deteriorated in the seven months following the death of her husband. Consequently, Lee came to believe that the only solution was killing herself and her children. Smith argued that Lee's belief that she had caused her father and husband's death and her son's cleft palate demonstrated that she was "disconnected from reality."

=== Verdict ===
The jury began deliberating on 23 September. After three and half hours of deliberating, the jury convicted Lee of murdering her two children Yuna and Minu Jo. Justice Venning confirmed the verdict and remanded Lee into custody until her sentencing on 26 November. She was subsequently given a life sentence and would be eligible to apply for parole after 17 years.

=== Appeal ===
In 2026 Lee appealed her sentence to the Court of Appeal, which agreed her sentence was manifestly unjust. The life sentence was maintained but the non-parole period was reduced to 10 years.
