= Christine Jasoni =

American-born New Zealand developmental neuroscientist

Christine Jasoni CRSNZ
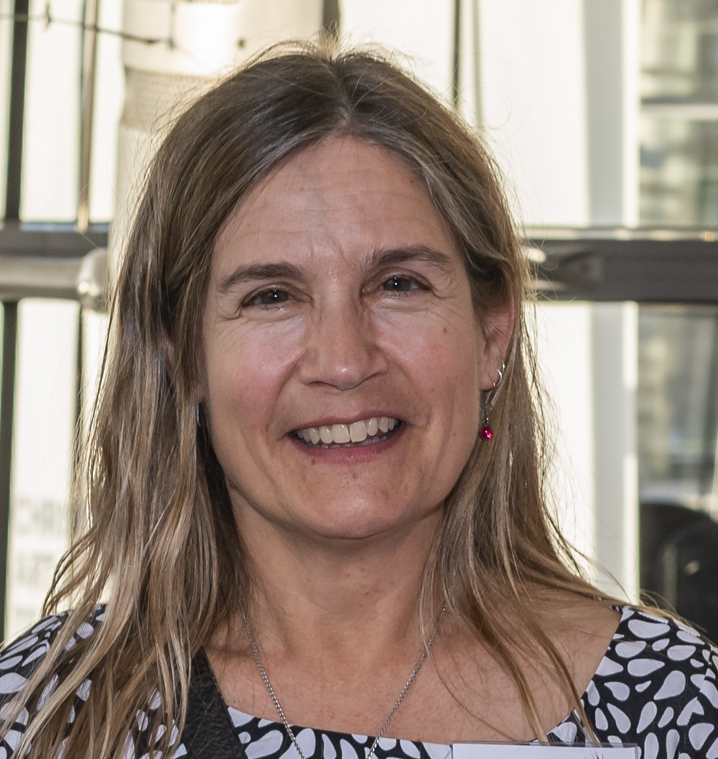
- Christine Jasoni in November 2020
- Education: University of Washington
- Scientific career
- Workplaces: University of Otago

Christine Jasoni CRSNZ is an American-born New Zealand academic specialising in foetal neural development. She is a professor at the University of Otago and has been the director of the university's Brain Health Research Centre since 2016. In 2020 she was elected a Ngā Takahoa a Te Apārangi Companion of Royal Society Te Apārangi.

Jasoni has a BSc from the University of California and a PhD from the University of Washington. She moved to New Zealand in 2001.

== Selected works ==
- Dong Won Kim; Sarah L Young; Dave Grattan; Christine L Jasoni (14 May 2014). "Obesity during pregnancy disrupts placental morphology, cell proliferation, and inflammation in a sex-specific manner across gestation in the mouse". Biology of Reproduction. 90 (6): 130. doi:10.1095/biolreprod.113.117259. ISSN 0006-3363. PMID 24829026. Wikidata Q50662556.
- Antonio Berretta; Emma K Gowing; Christine L Jasoni; Andrew Clarkson (23 February 2016). "Sonic hedgehog stimulates neurite outgrowth in a mechanical stretch model of reactive-astrogliosis". Scientific Reports. 6 21896. doi:10.1038/srep21896. ISSN 2045-2322. PMC 4763245. PMID 26902390. Wikidata Q36605973.
- Kelly A. Glendining; Christine L. Jasoni (15 January 2019). "Maternal High Fat Diet-Induced Obesity Modifies Histone Binding and Expression of Oxtr in Offspring Hippocampus in a Sex-Specific Manner". International Journal of Molecular Sciences. 20 (2): 329. doi:10.3390/ijms20020329. ISSN 1422-0067. PMC 6359595. PMID 30650536. Wikidata Q61816845.
- Kelly A Glendining; Lorryn C Fisher; Christine Jasoni (24 April 2020). "Maternal Obesity Modulates Expression of Satb2 in Hypothalamic VMN of Female Offspring". Life. 10 (4). doi:10.3390/life10040048. ISSN 2075-1729. PMC 7235991. PMID 32344561. Wikidata Q94448614.
