= New Zealand Institute for Public Health and Forensic Science =

New Zealand research institute

- Logo of PHF Science

Research institute overview
- Formed: July 1, 2025 (15 months ago)
- Preceding Research institute: Institute of Environmental Science and Research (ESR)
- Research institute executives: Ashley Bloomfield, Interim CEO; Sarah Young, Chair
- Website: phfscience.nz

The formation of the New Zealand Institute for Public Health and Forensic Science (PHF Science) was announced as part of the New Zealand science sector reforms. The Public Health and Forensic Science Institute came into being as a Public Research Organisation on 1 July 2025, and replaced the former Institute of Environmental Science and Research (ESR). The stated focus of PHF Science is "strengthening public health through disease detection and response; and supporting public safety through forensic science services."

== History ==
In late January 2025, Minister of Science, Innovation and Technology Judith Collins announced that the Crown Research Institutes would be replaced by four new Public Research Organisations. As part of the reform of the country's science sector, the Institute of Environmental Science and Research would be repurposed and restructured as the New Zealand Institute for Public Health and Forensic Science (PHF Science).

== Leadership ==
In May 2025, the Minister of Science, Innovation and Technology Shane Reti announced that the ESR's current board and chair Sarah Young would transition to lead the PHF Science.
