= Institute of Environmental Science and Research =

New Zealand Crown Research Institute

Coordinates: 41°8′50.95″S 174°50′22.5″E

Institute of Environmental Science and Research (ESR)
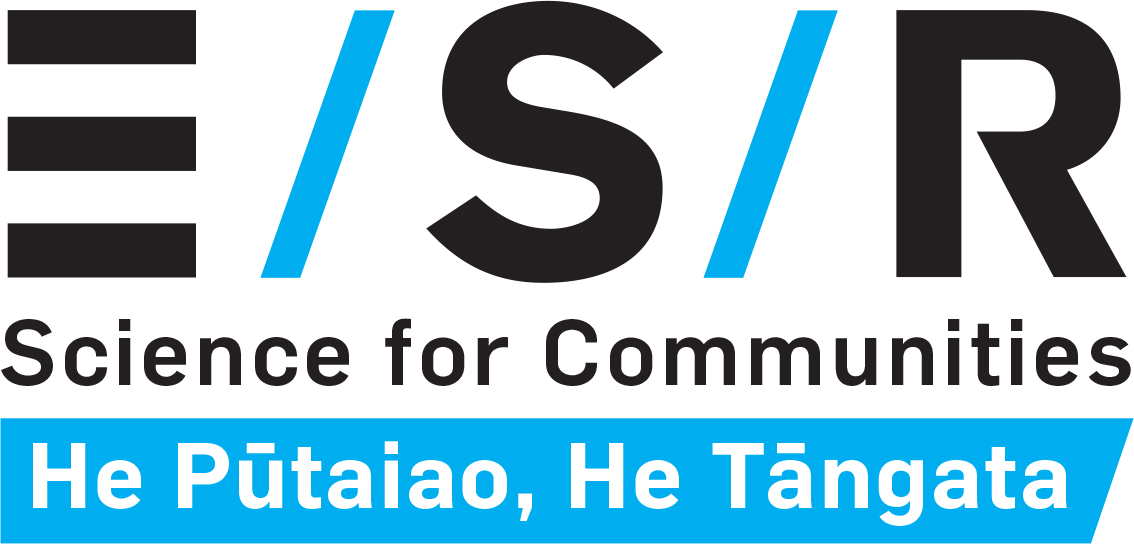

Crown Research Institute overview
- Formed: 1992 (34 years ago)
- Preceding Crown Research Institute: Department of Scientific and Industrial Research
- Dissolved: 1 July 2025
- Superseding Crown Research Institute: New Zealand Institute for Public Health and Forensic Science
- Headquarters: 34 Kenepuru Drive, Kenepuru, Porirua, New Zealand
- Employees: 600
- Crown Research Institute executives: Sir Ashley Bloomfield, interim CEO; Sarah Young, Chair
- Website: esr.cri.nz

The Institute of Environmental Science and Research (ESR) was a New Zealand Crown Research Institute (CRI). Its purpose was to deliver scientific and research services to the public health, food safety, security and justice systems, and the environmental sector to improve the safety of, and contribute to the economic, environmental and social well-being of people and communities in New Zealand. The institute was reorganised as the New Zealand Institute for Public Health and Forensic Science in July 2025.

== History ==
The institute was formed in 1992 from the New Zealand Government-owned Department of Scientific and Industrial Research (established in 1926). The Institute of Environmental Science and Research was one of seven science research businesses owned by the New Zealand Government that were, collectively, the largest dedicated providers of science research in New Zealand and some of the most significant commercial users of science and technology.

In late January 2025, Minister of Science, Innovation and Technology Judith Collins announced that the Institute of Environmental Science and Research would be repurposed and restructured as a new Public Research Organisation called the New Zealand Institute for Public Health and Forensic Science (known as PHF Science). This was part of a restructuring of the country's Crown Research Institutes. In May 2025, the Minister of Science, Innovation and Technology Shane Reti announced that the ESR's current board and chair Sarah Young would transition to lead PHF Science.

== Science expertise and services ==
ESR's science included the following disciplines:

- Public health – ESR worked with the Ministry of Health to improve public health. Using ESR reference laboratory information, the Notifiable Diseases Database and information collected from laboratories, ESR scientists collected and analysed data on a wide range of diseases present in New Zealand. ESR managed the New Zealand Microbiology Network, under contract to the Ministry of Health.
- Radiation science – ESR managed the National Centre for Radiation Science (NCRS) which supported the safe operation of radiation equipment in New Zealand. ESR provided advice, services, training and research on public, occupational and medical exposure to radiation. This included performance assessment of radiation protection equipment and equipment calibration.
- Social science – ESR's multidisciplinary social science team informed policy development and initiatives in public and environmental health, bicultural research, environmental policy, and community resilience. ESR's expertise contributed to better understanding how complex social issues can be tackled using a systems approach.
- Workplace drug and alcohol testing – ESR provided internationally accredited drug and alcohol testing to employers, prisons and the courts.
- Crime scene investigation – ESR's crime scene scientists, drug chemists, physical evidence specialists, toxicologists and biologists provided services to the New Zealand Police and other government agencies. ESR's forensic laboratories were accredited by the Laboratory Accreditation Board of the American Society of Crime Laboratory Directors. ESR's comprehensive knowledge of the recovery and interpretation of DNA evidence was used across the country and around the world.
- STRmix – ESR's forensic software can identify multiple individuals' DNA from complex mixed samples found at crime scenes, often resolving previously unresolvable DNA profiles. STRmix is used in DNA laboratories in the United States of America, United Kingdom and elsewhere.
- NZ Customs/ESR Screening Laboratory – The screening laboratory at Auckland International Airport identifies drugs in incoming international mail and air cargo using real-time testing capabilities. The information is used by Customs and other authorities to target criminal activity and streamline border protection operations.
- Food safety – ESR's experts worked across bacterial, viral, chemical, physical and radiological hazards in food to provide assurance to food producers and consumers in New Zealand and around the world. ESR also assisted with the response to foodborne disease outbreaks and ESR research is developing technology to improve animal health and dairy production.
- Water and the environment – ESR provided scientific advice and expertise on the management of drinking-water, groundwater, recreational and wastewater to health authorities, local and central governments, industry and communities. ESR also lead the Centre for Integrated Biowaste Research (CIBR) which combined the expertise of 10 New Zealand research institutes, universities and research partners to find solutions for the sustainable and safe use of biowaste.

== Science assets and facilities ==
ESR managed the following national science assets and facilities as part of New Zealand's science system:

- National Centre for Biosecurity and Infectious Disease
- National Influenza Centre and Polio and SARS Reference Laboratories
- National DNA Profile Databank
- Notifiable Disease Database
- New Zealand Reference Culture Collection (Medical section)
- Database of organisms present in pristine and contaminated groundwater systems
- National Centre for Radiation Science

== Locations ==
ESR staff worked from four main locations in New Zealand. In addition, ESR scientists provided science services in the Pacific region, Australia, Singapore, U.S., United Kingdom, Dubai, China, Japan, Europe.

In New Zealand:

- Mt Albert Science Centre, Auckland, New Zealand
- Kenepuru Science Centre, Porirua, New Zealand
- Christchurch Science Centre, Christchurch, New Zealand
- National Centre for Biosecurity and Infectious Diseases, Wallaceville, New Zealand
