= New Zealand Microbiology Network =

Advisory group to the Ministry of Health in New Zealand

The New Zealand Microbiology Network (NZMN) is an advisory group to the Ministry of Health in New Zealand. It was established in 2014 through a contract from the Ministry of Health to the Institute of Environmental Science and Research (ESR).

== Purpose ==
The group's stated purpose is "to enable a timely and consistent response to issues relating to laboratory testing and to ensure regular communication between microbiology laboratories in New Zealand".

== Membership ==
The membership of the group is around 30 people, most of whom are clinical microbiologists. They include:

- a clinical microbiologist from each District Health Board microbiology laboratory involved in communicable disease testing, whether private or public
- representatives of the Medical Officers of Health, and the Ministry for Primary Industries
- a member of the Protection, Regulation and Assurance division of the Ministry of Health
- three members from ESR, the Medical Director, a clinical microbiologist and a surveillance representative.

In addition, there is provision for two standing observers, the Chair of the Public Health Laboratory Network and a nominated representative of the Australian Department of Health. The Chair of the group is Anja Werno, Chief of Pathology and Medical Director of Microbiology at Canterbury Health Laboratories.

== Position statements ==
The Microbiology Network has published a number of position statements:

- STI screening in asymptomatic patients during cervical smear examination (29 August 2017)
- Laboratory processing of vaginal swabs in asymptomatic patients (7 September 2017)
- Inclusion of clinical details on request forms (published 6 June 2019)
- Point of care testing for diagnosis and clinical care of infectious diseases outside an accredited laboratory (October 2019)
- Responsibilities of the reference and referring laboratory (October 2019)
- Rapid Diagnostic Tests for SARS-CoV-2 (the virus that causes COVID-19) (1 April 2020)
- Testing Patients for SARS-CoV-2 (COVID-19) Prior to Transfer to Age Residential Care (ARC) (21 April 2020)
- NZMN position statement on Rapid Antigen Tests (RAT) for SARS CoV-2 in Aotearoa New Zealand (1 September 2021)
- NZMN updated position statement on saliva testing for SARS CoV-2 in New Zealand (16 September 2021)

== Advice on testing for SARS-CoV-2 ==
In April 2020, the NZMN advised against routine testing for SARS-CoV-2 of people being transferred into aged care. The NZMN's advice was questioned in the Rosewood rest home outbreak, and a cluster of outbreaks that affected six care homes nationally.

In April 2020 NZMN advised that testing for sexually transmitted diseases be restricted because the tests used some of the same components as were needed for COVID-19 testing. Some parts of the tests were subject to international supply chain issues arising from the COVID-19 pandemic. Testing for sexually transmitted diseases was reported as still being "sidelined" in August of that year.

In September 2021, advice from the NZMN was cited as a "key input" to the Ministry of Health's decision-making about saliva testing for SARS-CoV-2. Six months previously the NZMN had recommended the nasopharyngeal swab as the "gold standard" for testing. In September, in light of research showing that many symptomatic New Zealanders were failing to get tested for the virus, they reversed the earlier decision to not recommend saliva testing for COVID-19.

The Ministry of Health also receives advice on Covid-19 testing from the CT TAG advisory group (COVID-19 Testing Technical Advisory Group).
