= Sarah Young (immunologist) =

New Zealand immunologist

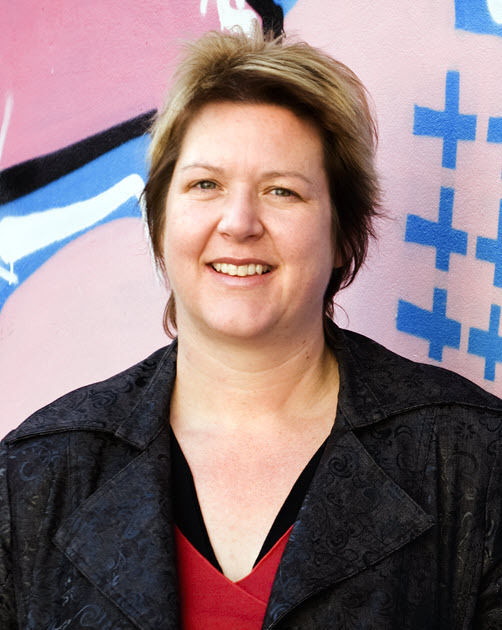
- Young in 2009
- Born: Tuatapere, New Zealand
- Education: University of Otago
- Scientific career
- Fields: Immunology
- Workplaces: Cancer Research UK, University of Otago University of Sydney, University of Canterbury
- Thesis: Immunological responses to live and live recombinant BCG in a murine model (2000)

Sarah Louise Young is a New Zealand immunology academic, and as of 2014 was head of pathology at the University of Otago. From 2020 to 2023, she ran the School of Medical Sciences at the University of Sydney. In 2023, Young was appointed the executive dean of the Faculty of Science at the University of Canterbury.

== Academic career ==
After a 2000 PhD titled 'Immunological responses to live and live recombinant BCG in a murine model ' at the University of Otago, and a post-doctoral positition at Cancer Research UK, Young returned to Otago rising to full professor.

== Selected works ==
- Mears, Rainy, Rachel A. Craven, Sarah Hanrahan, Nick Totty, Carol Upton, Sarah L. Young, Poulam Patel, Peter J. Selby, and Rosamonde E. Banks. "Proteomic analysis of melanoma‐derived exosomes by two‐dimensional polyacrylamide gel electrophoresis and mass spectrometry." Proteomics 4, no. 12 (2004): 4019–4031.
- Sutherland, Tim JT, Jan O. Cowan, Sarah Young, Ailsa Goulding, Andrea M. Grant, Avis Williamson, Karen Brassett, G. Peter Herbison, and D. Robin Taylor. "The association between obesity and asthma: interactions between systemic and airway inflammation." American journal of respiratory and critical care medicine 178, no. 5 (2008): 469–475.
- Young, Sarah L., Mary A. Simon, Margaret A. Baird, Gerald W. Tannock, Rodrigo Bibiloni, Kate Spencely, Juliette M. Lane et al. "Bifidobacterial species differentially affect expression of cell surface markers and cytokines of dendritic cells harvested from cord blood." Clin. Diagn. Lab. Immunol. 11, no. 4 (2004): 686–690.
- Kim, Dong Won, Sarah L. Young, David R. Grattan, and Christine L. Jasoni. "Obesity during pregnancy disrupts placental morphology, cell proliferation, and inflammation in a sex-specific manner across gestation in the mouse." Biology of reproduction 90, no. 6 (2014): 130–1.
- Win, Stephanie J., Vernon K. Ward, P. Rod Dunbar, Sarah L. Young, and Margaret A. Baird. "Cross‐presentation of epitopes on virus‐like particles via the MHC I receptor recycling pathway." Immunology and cell biology 89, no. 6 (2011): 681–688.
