= Makarena Dudley =

New Zealand psychologist

Makarena Dudley MNZM
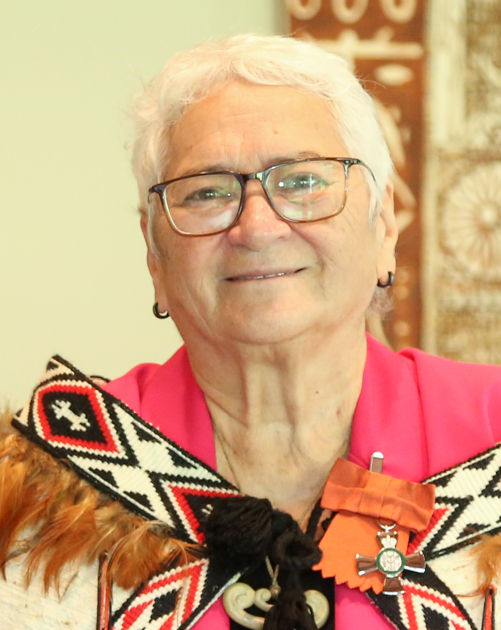
- Dudley in 2025
- Education: University of Auckland; University of Waikato
- Scientific career
- Fields: Neuropsychology, dementia and Māori psychology
- Workplaces: University of Auckland
- Thesis: Evaluating the impact of Attention Process Training (APT) on attention deficit in the early stages of recovery from stroke (2011)

Makarena Diana Dudley MNZM, also known as Margaret Dudley, is a New Zealand clinical psychologist, neuropsychologist and academic, specialising in neuropsychology, dementia and Māori health psychology research. She is currently one of the co-directors of the clinical psychology programme at the University of Auckland. In 2016, Dudley became the first permanent Māori clinical psychology lecturer employed at the University of Auckland. Dudley's iwi include Te Rarawa, Te Aupōuri and Ngāti Kahu. In 2025 Dudley was appointed a Member of the New Zealand Order of Merit for services to people with dementia, particularly Māori.

== Biography ==
Dudley was one of ten children growing up in central Auckland, attending Blockhouse Bay Intermediate and Lynfield College, leaving at 15. In 1970 Dudley joined the Royal New Zealand Air Force, being promoted to sergeant at 18. In 1980, Dudley wed and moved to Australia, having a child with her partner. By 1985 she and her partner had divorced, and Dudley raised her child solo while working as a courier driver and cleaner. In 1990, Dudley returned to New Zealand, studying at the University of Auckland, funding her studies through Te Rūnanga o Te Rarawa. By 1996 she had graduated with a post-graduate diploma in clinical psychology.

After graduating, Dudley worked as a clinical psychologist in Auckland and Northland for 15 years. In 2008, she was awarded a fellowship to complete a doctorate in neuropsychology at the University of Waikato investigating the efficacy of Attention Process Training during stroke recovery, which began as a part of the Stroke Attention Rehabilitation Trial (START), which she competed in 2011. After completing her doctorate, Dudley was employed by the Auckland University of Technology, where she researched neuropsychology. In 2016, Dudley became the first permanent Māori clinical psychology lecturer employed at the University of Auckland.

In 2017, Dudley was named by Health Research Council of New Zealand as the principal investigator of a team to investigate misdiagnosis of Māori with dementia. By 2020, Dudley was still only one of four Māori neuropsychologists in New Zealand. In 2020, Dudley was awarded a fellowship by Alzheimers New Zealand, in order to further research on the impacts of dementia. As a part of this project, a smartphone app was released to help families identify early signs of mate wareware (dementia), while following Tikanga Māori.

In the 2025 New Year Honours, Dudley was appointed a Member of the New Zealand Order of Merit, for services to people with dementia, particularly Māori.

== Selected works ==
- Ogden, Jenni A.; Cooper, Erana; Dudley, Margaret (2003). "Adapting neuropsychological assessments for minority groups: A study comparing white and Maori New Zealanders". Brain Impairment. 4 (2): 122–134. doi:10.1375/brim.4.2.122.27026. S2CID 146634887.
- Barker-Collo, Suzanne; Feigin, Valery L.; Dudley, Margaret (2007). "Post stroke fatigue--where is the evidence to guide practice?". The New Zealand Medical Journal. 120 (1264): U2780. PMID 17972987.
- Dudley, M.; Barker-Collo, S.; Starkey, N. (2010). "Impact of attention process training on attention in early recovery from stroke: FC70002". International Journal of Stroke. 5.
- Dudley, Margaret; Wilson, Denise; Barker-Collo, Suzanne (2014). "Cultural invisibility: Māori people with traumatic brain injury and their experiences of neuropsychological assessments". New Zealand Journal of Psychology. 43 (3).
- Barker-Collo, Suzanne; Jones, Kelly; Theadom, Alice; Starkey, Nicola; Dowell, Anthony; McPherson, Kathryn; Ameratunga, Shanthi; Dudley, Margaret; Te Ao, Braden; Feigin, Valery (2015). "Neuropsychological outcome and its correlates in the first year after adult mild traumatic brain injury: A population-based New Zealand study". Brain Injury. 29 (13–14): 1604–1616. doi:10.3109/02699052.2015.1075143. PMID 26382561. S2CID 45092567.
- Kersten, Paula; Czuba, Karol; McPherson, Kathryn; Dudley, Margaret; Elder, Hinemoa; Tauroa, Robyn; Vandal, Alain (2016). "A systematic review of evidence for the psychometric properties of the Strengths and Difficulties Questionnaire". International Journal of Behavioral Development. 40 (1): 64–75. doi:10.1177/0165025415570647. hdl:10292/9604. S2CID 144725727.
- Kersten, Paula; Dudley, Margaret; Nayar, Shoba; Elder, Hinemoa; Robertson, Heather; Tauroa, Robyn; McPherson, Kathryn M. (2016). "Cross-cultural acceptability and utility of the strengths and difficulties questionnaire: views of families". BMC Psychiatry. 16 (1): 347. doi:10.1186/s12888-016-1063-7. PMC 5062850. PMID 27733140.
- Dudley, Margaret; Scott, Kelly; Barker-Collo, Suzanne (2017). "Is the test of premorbid functioning a valid measure for Maori in New Zealand?". New Zealand Journal of Psychology. 46 (3): 72–79.
- Theadom, Alice; Barker-Collo, Suzanne; Jones, Kelly; Dudley, Margaret; Vincent, Norah; Feigin, Valery (2018). "A pilot randomized controlled trial of on-line interventions to improve sleep quality in adults after mild or moderate traumatic brain injury". Clinical Rehabilitation. 32 (5): 619–629. doi:10.1177/0269215517736671. PMID 29072086. S2CID 42570091.
- Dudley, Margaret D.; Barker-Collo, Suzanne L.; Wilson, Denise L.; Garrett, Nick K. (2019). "Factors associated with Māori performance on the WAIS-IV". Archives of Clinical Neuropsychology. 34 (7): 1203–1216. doi:10.1093/arclin/acy110. PMID 30805644.
- Dudley, Margaret; Menzies, Oliver; Elder, Hinemoa; Nathan, Lisa; Garrett, Nick; Wilson, Denise (2019). "Mate wareware: Understanding 'dementia'from a Māori perspective". NZ Med J. 132 (1503): 66–74.
- Howard, Kelly; McCann, Clare; Dudley, Margaret (2020). "'It was like more easier': Rangatahi (Young People) and Their whānau (Family) Talk About Communication Assistance in the New Zealand Youth Justice System". Youth Justice: 1473225420923763.
- Howard, Kelly; McCann, Clare; Dudley, Margaret (2020). "What is communication assistance? Describing a new and emerging profession in the New Zealand youth justice system". Psychiatry, Psychology and Law. 27 (2): 300–314. doi:10.1080/13218719.2020.1719378. PMC 7476609. PMID 32944128.
- Howard, Kelly; McCann, Clare; Dudley, Margaret (2020). "'I was flying blind a wee bit': Professionals' perspectives on challenges facing communication assistance in the New Zealand youth justice system". The International Journal of Evidence & Proof. 24 (2): 104–120. doi:10.1177/1365712719877893. S2CID 210577111.
- Howard, Kelly; McCann, Clare; Dudley, Margaret (2020). "'It's really good… why hasn't it happened earlier?'Professionals' perspectives on the benefits of communication assistance in the New Zealand youth justice system". Australian & New Zealand Journal of Criminology. 53 (2): 265–284. doi:10.1177/0004865819890377. S2CID 214193920.
- Menzies, Oliver; Dudley, Margaret; Garrett, Nick; Elder, Hinemoa; Daniels, Piripi; Wilson, Denise (2021). "He Tūhononga Whaiaro: A Kaupapa Māori Approach to Mate Wareware (Dementia) and Cognitive Assessment of Older Māori". Journal of Applied Gerontology. 41 (4): 1066–1073. doi:10.1177/07334648211037504. PMID 34365859. S2CID 236960198.
