= University of Auckland Faculty of Medical and Health Sciences =

Medical and Health Sciences school in New Zealand

Coordinates: 36.8618°S 174.7697°E

Faculty of Medical and Health Sciences
- Mātauranga Hauora (Māori)
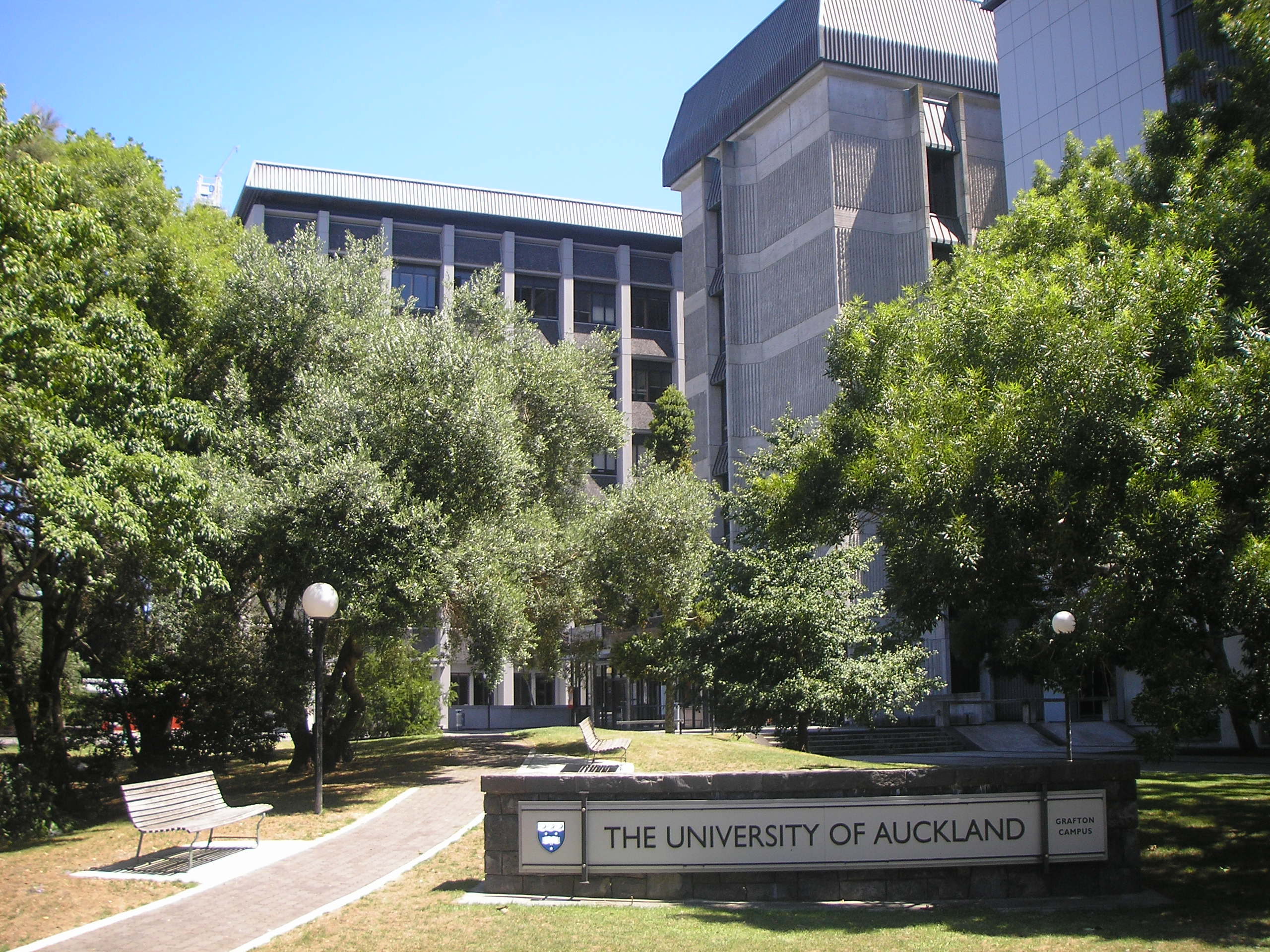
- Part of the faculty buildings at Grafton
- Type: Public
- Established: 1968
- Parent institution: University of Auckland
- Dean: Warwick Bagg
- Location: Auckland, New Zealand
- Website: fmhs.auckland.ac.nz

The University of Auckland Faculty of Medical and Health Sciences (FMHS; Māori: Mātauranga Hauora) was established in 1968 as The University of Auckland School of Medicine at its present site in Grafton, Auckland.

== History ==
Talk of establishing a medical school in Auckland began in the 1880s. From 1886 University of Otago medical students were able to complete their first year 'medical intermediate' at Auckland University College before going to Dunedin.

From 1938, Auckland Hospital Board hosted a branch of the University of Otago's medical school to facilitate training of sixth year students. In 1946, the Board opened the Postgraduate School of Obstetrics and Gynaecology, first at Cornwall Hospital and later at the National Women's Hospital. Auckland University College established a Medical Education Committee in 1945.

In the early 1950s, with developments and changes in medical practice and a growing population, the Gibbes Watson Committee, established by the senate of the University of New Zealand, recommended another medical school in Auckland within 15–20 years. In 1958 the Auckland University College set up a Steering Committee on Medical Education chaired by Douglas Robb, who is acknowledged as 'father of the school' for his determination and advocacy. The Steering Committee's membership was made up of academic, medical, layperson and hospital board representatives. In 1961 the University of New Zealand was dissolved and the University of Auckland became a separate entity and continued to exert momentum for the school.

Although the government had agreed in 1959 that the second medical school would be in Auckland it was not until 1964 that it gave final approval for the school. The same year, Dr Wilton Henley was seconded from his position as Medical Superintendent in Chief of the Auckland Hospital Board to assist planning the school; he was another driving force in its establishment. The first Dean, Cecil Lewis, was appointed in 1965 and the site in Park Rd opposite Auckland Hospital was approved. In 1967 the government approved funding for the construction of buildings. The Queen officially opened the school in 1970.

The first intake of 60 students was in 1968. Their courses were initially taught at the main university campus because the school buildings were not ready though teaching transferred to the Grafton site from 1970; the hospital also provided space for the students. Student numbers doubled in 1975 with 130 first year students in 1976.

During the tenure of Peter Gluckman as Dean, from 1992 to 2001, the school became the Faculty of Medical and Health Sciences as the school expanded from medicine and medical sciences to include other health science disciplines like pharmacy and nursing.

=== Curriculum ===
The curriculum was designed to be different to the existing offering at the University of Otago by ensuring students received a broad university education. In the first three years students studied for a Bachelor of Science in Human Biology, with the first intake of students in 1968 graduating with a BSc in Human Biology in 1971 and a MBChB in 1974. In 1971 the Bachelor degree was changed to Bachelor of Human Biology. Social sciences, medical humanities and community health were included in the medical degree.

During the 1980s and 1990s, with consideration to the current health needs in society, the school appointed academics in general practice, women's health, Māori health and medical ethics. A Māori Advisory Council, Bicultural Committee and Community Liaison Committee were also established. A graduate school of Health Sciences was also established and the first MD graduated in 1985.

== Buildings ==
The faculty buildings were designed by architects Stephenson and Turner, constructed between 1967 and 1974 and consisted of four main buildings. They were in the brutalist style of architecture. Since the 1970s Stephenson and Turner have undertaken alterations to cater for changes in teaching, research and programmes including upgrades to laboratories, the Philson Library and student facilities.

From 2005 to 2012 there was a redevelopment of the campus and refurbishment of buildings to accommodate Schools of Nursing, Pharmacy, Optometry and Ophthalmology, and the Liggins Institute. An Information Commons opened in 2004 and the Medical Sciences Learning Centre Whakaaro Pai in 2005. Prime Minister John Key opened the Boyle Building in 2012. The redeveloped buildings were designed by Jasmax.

=== Artworks ===
In 1975 artworks by Colin McCahon were installed in the elevator lobbies. Called the Roman Numerals Series they are Roman numerals I to V. Other artworks in the school are the Seven Ages of Man panels by Pat Hanly, a wood and perspex work by Don Driver, sculptures by Marté Szirmay and Tom Taylor, a cast steel and bronze work by Greer Twiss, a mural by eye surgeon Harold Coop, a sundial by Marion Fountain, and Māori carvings by David Tipene-Leach and Te Rikawa Dallas Eru Tawha Thompson.

== Research ==
As at 2026 the faculty has 7 research centres: the Aotearoa–New Zealand National Eye Centre (ANZ–NEC), Auckland Cancer Society Research Centre (ACSRC), Centre for Addiction Research (CFAR), The Centre for Translational Health Research: Informing Policy and Practice (TRANSFORM), Eisdell Moore Centre (EMC), Manaaki Mānawa – The Centre for Heart Research, and the Medical Imaging Research Centre (MIRC).

The faculty also hosts several other transdisciplinary research centres:Te Aka Mātauranga Matepukupuku / The Centre for Cancer Research; Te Poutoko Ora a Kiwa / Centre for Pacific and Global Health; CCREATE-AGE: Centre for Co-Created Ageing Research; and the Centre for Brain Research (CBR). The Centre for Brain Research opened in 2009, directed by Richard Faull and Alan Barber. It has a brain bank of brains donated since the 1980s by people who died with neurological diseases such as Huntington's disease and Parkinson's disease as well as researching the brains of sports people with brain injuries.

The Auckland Medical Research Foundation, which was founded in 1956, funded the Medical Sciences Learning Centre Whakaaro Pai which was opened by Prime Minister Helen Clark in 2005. The Centre is used to teach anatomy, pathology and radiology to students in medicine, nursing, dentistry and health sciences.

== Schools and departments ==
As at 2026 FMHS consists of 6 schools all of which are based on the Grafton Campus:

- School of Medical Sciences
- School of Medicine
- School of Nursing
- School of Optometry and Vision Sciences
- School of Pharmacy
- School of Population Health

Te Kupenga Hauora Māori, a department led by Papaarangi Reid, promotes teaching about Māori health and deeper understanding and knowledge of health inequities between Māori and non-Māori.

The Philson Library opened in 1970 and is named after Thomas Moore Philson, a notable doctor and medical superintendent of Auckland Hospital, who set up a trust fund to found a medical library for students.

== Notable people ==
=== Deans ===
- Cecil Lewis, 1965 – 1974
- David Cole, 1974 – 1989
- Derek North, 1989 – 1992
- Peter Gluckman, 1992 – 2001
- Peter Smith, 2001 – 2005
- Iain Martin, 2005 – 2001
- John Fraser, 2011 – 2024
- Warwick Bagg, 2024 to date

=== Alumni ===
- Ashley Bloomfield
- Felicity Goodyear-Smith
- Glenn Colquhoun
- Innes Asher
- Lance O'Sullivan
- Michael Baker
- Renee Liang

=== Faculty ===
- Aiono Alec Ekeroma
- Collin Tukuitonga
- Diana Lennon
- John Scott
- Papaarangi Reid
- Richard Faull
