= Sunny Collings =

New Zealand psychiatrist

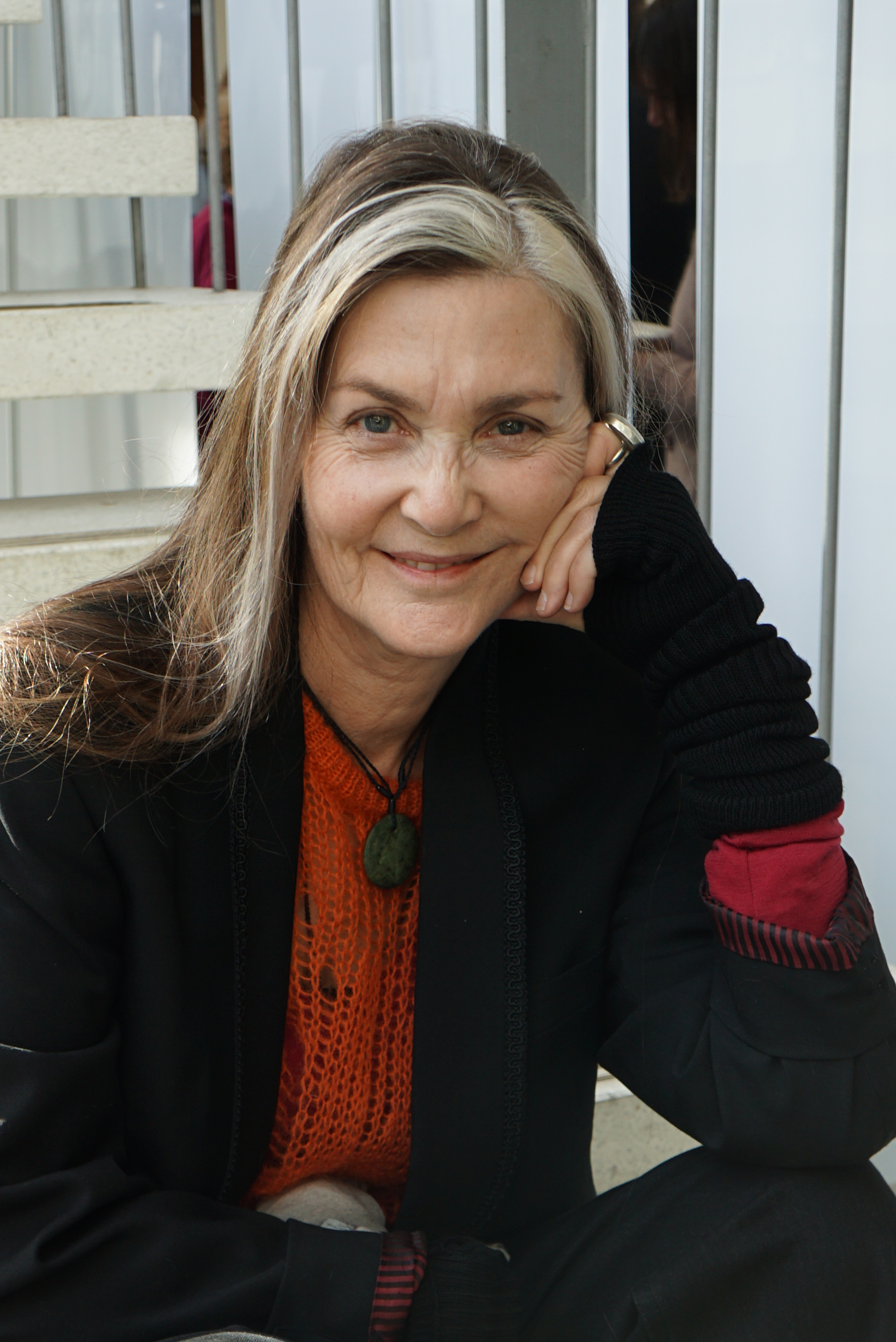
- Collings in 2025

Academic background
- Education: University of Otago
- Thesis: Informal carers of people with schizophrenia in New Zealand: their health, circumstances and adjustment. (2006)

Academic work
- Institutions: Victoria University of Wellington; University of Otago; Health Research Council of New Zealand
- Doctoral students: Felicity Goodyear-Smith

Catherine Diane Collings, known as Sunny, is a New Zealand psychiatrist and health executive, and was a full professor at the University of Otago, specialising in suicide prevention. She was chief executive of the Health Research Council of New Zealand, before being appointed in 2025 to lead the Health Quality and Safety Commission.

== Academic career ==
Collings completed a medical degree at the University of Otago, graduating in 1984. She worked as a general practitioner and completed psychiatric training at the Maudsley Hospital and the Royal Free Hospital in London, where she studied bulimia nervosa with Professor Michael King. Collings also holds a Postgraduate Diploma in Public Health (with Distinction) and a PhD, both from Otago. Collings joined the faculty of the University of Otago as a senior lecturer in 1991, rising to full professor in 2011. She has also supervised doctoral students in the School of Health at Victoria University of Wellington and at the University of Auckland. One of her notable doctoral students is Felicity Goodyear-Smith. Collings is a Fellow of the Royal College of Psychiatrists and the Royal Australian and New Zealand College of Psychiatrists.

Collings's research focuses on mental health, self-harm and suicide prevention, although she has also published on other topics such as ethics and food security. She is a board member of the Mental Health and Wellbeing Commission. Collings was an expert adviser on an inquest into the deaths of four teenage girls in Flaxmere.

Collings was Dean and Head of Campus at the University of Otago, Wellington for nine years. In 2019 she was appointed as the chief executive of the Health Research Council. In July 2025 she was appointed CEO of Te Tāhū Hauora Health Quality & Safety Commission.

== Selected works ==
- Blakely TA; Collings, Catherine Diane; Atkinson J (2003). "Unemployment and suicide. Evidence for a causal association?". Journal of Epidemiology and Community Health. 57 (8): 594–600. doi:10.1136/jech.57.8.594. PMC 1732539. PMID 12883065. Wikidata Q35412742.
- McKenzie, Sarah K.; Collings, Catherine Diane; Jenkin, Gabrielle L. S.; Jo River (2018). "Masculinity, Social Connectedness, and Mental Health: Men's Diverse Patterns of Practice". American Journal of Men's Health. 12 (5): 1247–1261. doi:10.1177/1557988318772732. PMC 6142169. PMID 29708008. Wikidata Q64330255.
- Carter, Kristie; Kerri Kruse; Blakely, Tony; Collings, Catherine Diane (2011). "The association of food security with psychological distress in New Zealand and any gender differences". Social Science & Medicine. 72 (9): 1463–1471. doi:10.1016/j.socscimed.2011.03.009. PMID 21481507. Wikidata Q50110270.
- Airini; Collings, Catherine Diane; Conner, Lindsey; McPherson, Kathryn Margaret; Midson, Brenda Rosalie; Wilson, Cheryl (2010). "Learning to Be Leaders in Higher Education: What Helps or Hinders Women's Advancement as Leaders in Universities". Educational Management Administration & Leadership. 39 (1): 44–62. doi:10.1177/1741143210383896. Wikidata Q58761152.
- Beautrais, Annette L; Collings, Sunny; Ehrhardt, P; Henare, K (2005). Suicide Prevention: A review of evidence of risk and protective factors, and points of effective intervention (Report). Ministry of Health.
