= Kathryn McPherson =

New Zealand medical researcher

Kathryn Margaret McPherson
- Education: University of Edinburgh
- Scientific career
- Fields: rehabilitation
- Workplaces: Auckland University of Technology
- Thesis: Functional recovery after brain injury rehabilitation (1998)
- Doctoral students: Matire Harwood

Kathryn Margaret McPherson is a New Zealand medical researcher and administrator. As of 2018 she is a full professor at the Auckland University of Technology and chief executive of the Health Research Council of New Zealand.

== Academic career ==
After training as a nurse in Australia and a midwife in Scotland, McPherson did a 1998 PhD from the University of Edinburgh titled 'Functional recovery after brain injury rehabilitation' . McPherson moved to Auckland University of Technology in New Zealand, receiving many research grants and holding numerous posts, including the board of Work and Income. Notable students include Matire Harwood.

Since 2015 McPherson has been chief executive of the Health Research Council of New Zealand.

McPherson's research focuses on rehabilitation and return-to-work, especially after brain injuries and events.

== Selected works ==
- Lord, Susan E., Kathryn McPherson, Harry K. McNaughton, Lynn Rochester, and Mark Weatherall. "Community ambulation after stroke: how important and obtainable is it and what measures appear predictive? 1." Archives of Physical Medicine and Rehabilitation 85, no. 2 (2004): 234–239.
- McPherson, K., L. Headrick, and F. Moss. "Working and learning together: good quality care depends on it, but how can we achieve it?." BMJ Quality & Safety 10, no. suppl 2 (2001): ii46-ii53.
- Young, Amanda E., Richard T. Roessler, Radoslaw Wasiak, Kathryn M. McPherson, Mireille NM Van Poppel, and J. R. Anema. "A developmental conceptualization of return to work." Journal of Occupational Rehabilitation 15, no. 4 (2005): 557–568.
- Levack, William MM, Kathryn Taylor, Richard J. Siegert, Sarah G. Dean, Kath M. McPherson, and Mark Weatherall. "Is goal planning in rehabilitation effective? A systematic review." Clinical rehabilitation 20, no. 9 (2006): 739–755.
- Feigin, Valery L., Alice Theadom, Suzanne Barker-Collo, Nicola J. Starkey, Kathryn McPherson, Michael Kahan, Anthony Dowell et al. "Incidence of traumatic brain injury in New Zealand: a population-based study." The Lancet Neurology 12, no. 1 (2013): 53–64.
- Czuba, Karol J., Nicola Kayes, Kathryn McPherson. "Support workers' experiences of work stress in long-term care settings: a qualitative study." International Journal of Qualitative Studies on Health and Well-being. 14 (1) (2019): 1622356.
