= Innes Asher =

New Zealand professor of paediatrics

Innes Asher ONZM
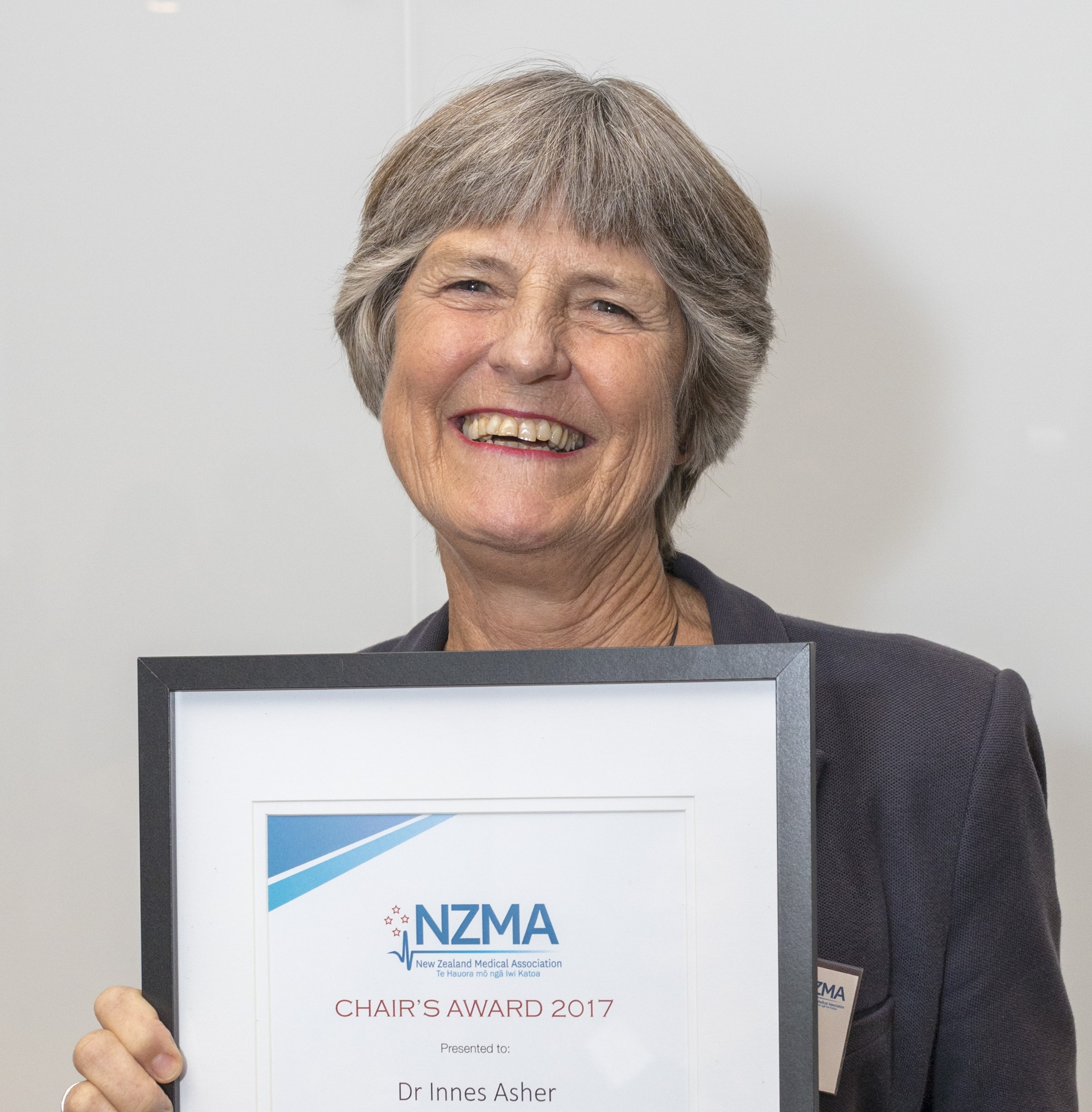
- Innes Asher

Academic work
- Discipline: Paediatrics
- Institutions: University of Auckland

Monica Innes Asher ONZM is a New Zealand paediatrician. She is professor of paediatrics at the University of Auckland.

== Early life ==
Asher studied at the Auckland Medical School from 1968 to 1973. She also undertook postgraduate study in Paediatrics in Auckland, Whakatāne, Ruatoki and at the Montreal Children's Hospital for three years. She also specialised in respiratory medicine in Montreal.

== Career ==
Asher has been a committee member and health spokesperson for the Child Poverty Action Group for 20 years.

Asher became the first Auckland graduate to join the medical school faculty. In 2016 she stepped down as Head of the University of Auckland's Department of Paediatrics: Child and Youth Health, after being in the role since 2002.

In May 2018 she was appointed to the Government's Welfare Expert Advisory Group.

She is the chairperson of the Global Asthma Network Executive Group.

=== Honours and awards ===
- In the 2003 New Year Honours, Asher was appointed an Officer of the New Zealand Order of Merit, for services to paediatrics.
- In 2007, the Health Research Council awarded her the Liley Medal for her research leadership.
- In 2017, she was selected as one of the Royal Society of New Zealand's "150 women in 150 words".
- In 2018, she received the New Zealand Medical Association’s Chair’s Award for 2017. The award was in recognition of her work to raise awareness of poverty as a key cause for acute and chronic ill-health among children.
