= Nicola Kayes =

New Zealand health psychologist and rehabilitation researcher

- Other name: Nicola M. Kayes
- Education: University of Auckland
- Alma mater: Auckland University of Technology
- Scientific career
- Fields: health psychology
- Institutions: Auckland University of Technology
- Thesis: Physical Activity Engagement in People with Multiple Sclerosis (2011)
- Doctoral advisor: Kathryn McPherson

Nicola M. Kayes is a New Zealand health psychologist, director of the Centre for Person Centred Research and professor of rehabilitation at Auckland University of Technology (AUT).

== Academic career ==
Kayes graduated from the University of Auckland with a BSc in 1997 and MSc in 1999 for her thesis titled "The Role that Illness Perceptions Play in the Adjustment to Multiple Sclerosis". She completed a PhD at AUT titled "Physical activity engagement in people with Multiple Sclerosis" in March 2011.

In November 2019, Kayes was promoted to full professor at AUT. As of 2021 she is immediate past president of the New Zealand Rehabilitation Association and a principal investigator with Brain Research New Zealand.

== Selected publications ==
- Tiago Silva Jesus; Felicity A S Bright; Cátia S Pinho; Christina Papadimitriou; Nicola Kayes; Cheryl Cott (25 September 2019). "Scoping review of the person-centered literature in adult physical rehabilitation". Disability and Rehabilitation: 1–11. doi:10.1080/09638288.2019.1668483. ISSN 0963-8288. PMID 31553633. Wikidata Q90279366.
- Karol J Czuba; Nicola Kayes; Kathryn McPherson (1 December 2019). "Support workers' experiences of work stress in long-term care settings: a qualitative study". International Journal of Qualitative Studies on Health and Well-being. 14 (1) 1622356. doi:10.1080/17482631.2019.1622356. ISSN 1748-2623. PMC 6566720. PMID 31156047. Wikidata Q64890862.
- Suzie Mudge; Ann Sezier; Deborah Payne; Greta Smith; Nicola Kayes (30 January 2020). "Pilot trial of The Living Well Toolkit: qualitative analysis and implications for refinement and future implementation". BMC Health Services Research. 20 (1): 69. doi:10.1186/S12913-020-4920-5. ISSN 1472-6963. PMC 6993322. PMID 32000768. Wikidata Q89450002.
