= 2003 New Year Honours (New Zealand) =

Annual awards for New Zealanders

- Previous: 2002 Queen's Birthday and Golden Jubilee Honours; Next: 2003 Queen's Birthday Honours
- Type: New Zealand royal honours: New Zealand Order of Merit; Queen's Service Order; Queen's Service Medal
- Date: 31 December 2002
- Country: New Zealand
- Total recipients: 187

The 2003 New Year Honours in New Zealand were appointments by Elizabeth II in her right as Queen of New Zealand, on the advice of the New Zealand government, to various orders and honours to reward and highlight good works by New Zealanders, and to celebrate the passing of 2002 and the beginning of 2003. They were announced on 31 December 2002.

The recipients of honours are listed here as they were styled before their new honour.

== New Zealand Order of Merit ==
=== Distinguished Companion (DCNZM) ===
- Dr (Vera) Doreen Blumhardt CBE – of Wellington. For services to pottery and art education.
- The Right Honourable Jennifer Mary Shipley – of Auckland. For services as a Member of Parliament.
- Bruce Houlton Slane CBE – of Auckland. For services to personal and human rights, and the law.
- Peter John Trapski CBE – of Tauranga. For services to the law and the community.
Doreen Blumhardt

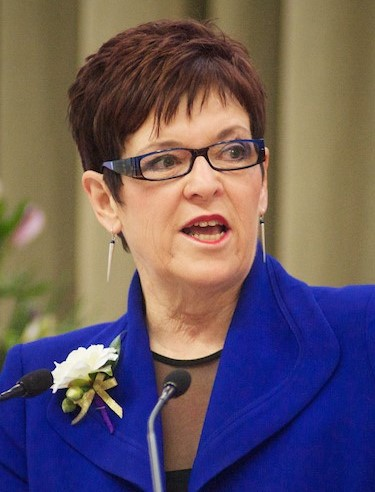
Jenny Shipley

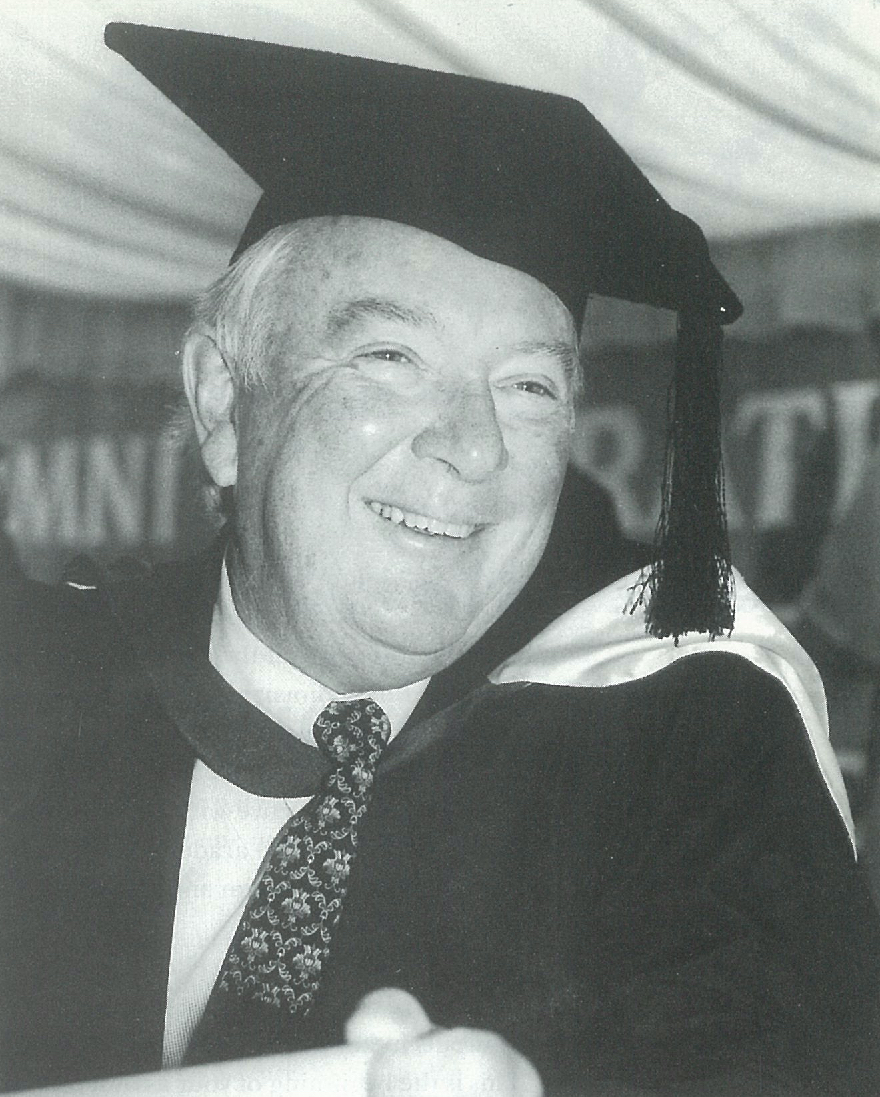
Peter Trapski

=== Companion (CNZM) ===
- John Murray Black QSO JP – of Taupō. For services to local government.
- Peter Wing Ho Chin – of Dunedin. For services to local body and community affairs.
- Robert Moncrieff Clarkson – of Tauranga. For services to philanthropy.
- The Right Honourable Wyatt Beetham Creech – of Martinborough. For services as a Member of Parliament.
- Melvin Norman Day – of Wellington. For services to painting and art history.
- Anne Gertrude Shorland Gambrill – of Auckland. For services as a master of the High Court.
- Lynette Jones – of Blenheim. For services to the New Zealand Red Cross Society and the community.
- Sister Pauline Anne Leonard – of Hamilton. For services to education.
- Graeme Eric Selby Lowe QSM – of Havelock North. For services to the meat industry and the community.
- Professor Roger Stewart Morris – of Palmerston North. For services to veterinary science.
- Mary Judith Mowbray – of Wellington. For services to women.
- John Lindell O'Sullivan LVO – of Lower Hutt. For public services, lately as general manager, Parliamentary Service.
- The Honourable Peter George Spenser Penlington QC – of Christchurch. For services as a judge of the High Court.
- Dr Richard Patrick Suggate – of Wellington. For services to geology.
- Dr Franklin Henry Wood – of Prebbleton. For services to tertiary education.
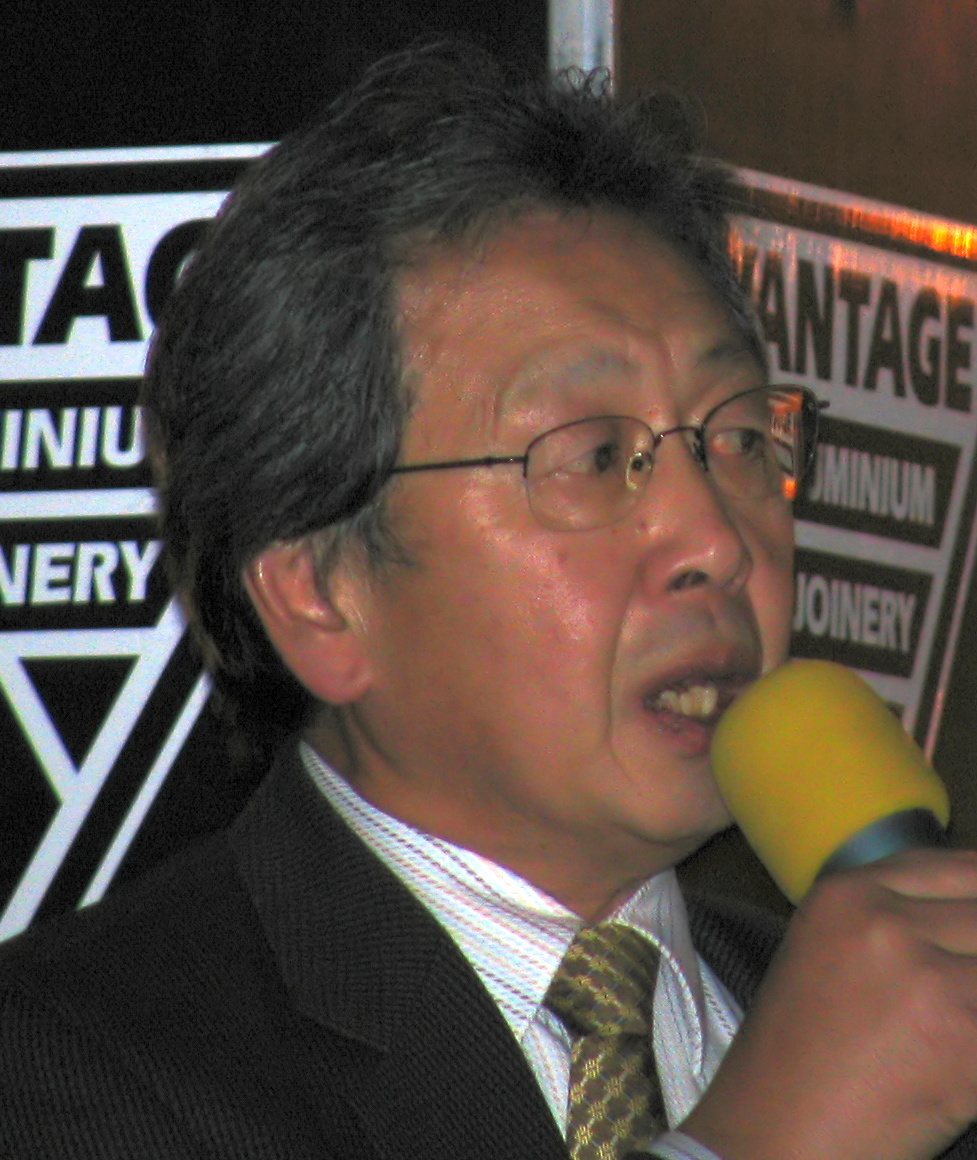
Peter Chin

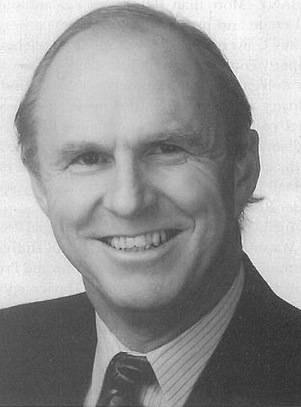
Wyatt Creech

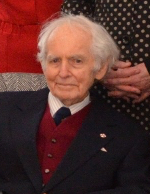
Melvin Day

=== Officer (ONZM) ===
- Professor (Monica) Innes Asher – of Auckland. For services to paediatrics.
- Professor Bruce Charles Baguley – of Auckland. For services to cancer research.
- Emeritus Professor John Anthony Barsby – of Dunedin. For services to classical studies.
- Associate Professor Alexander Cheong Ping Chu JP – of Palmerston North. For services to agriculture.
- Mervyn Tutuiri Church – of Rotorua. For services to the sport of rodeo.
- Jean Ann Curry – of Kerikeri. For services to bowls.
- David Joseph Dobbyn – of Auckland. For services to music.
- Philip Hugh Gayton – of New Plymouth. For services to volleyball.
- Peter Thomas Isaacs – of Paraparaumu. For services to adult literacy and the community.
- Emeritus Professor Alexander Keith Jeffery – of Dunedin. For services to orthopaedics.
- Stephen Albert Jelicich – of Auckland. For services to architecture and the community.
- Doreen Isabella McLay – of Waimate. For services to bowls and the community.
- Dr Sidney (Hirini) Melbourne – of Hamilton. For services to Māori language, music and culture.
- Margaret Elizabeth Morriss – of Palmerston North. For services to floral art.
- Michael Anthony Nock – of Ashfield, Australia || For services to jazz.
- Lance Anthony O'Sullivan – of Matamata. For services to thoroughbred racing.
- Ronald Allan Palenski – of Dunedin. For services to sports journalism.
- Neale Morgan Pitches – of Wellington. For services to education.
- Dr Irihapeti Merenia Ramsden – of Wellington. For services to nursing education.
- Colonel Kevin James Riordan – Colonels' List, New Zealand Army.
- Audrey Severinsen – of Palmerston North. For services to local body and community affairs.
- Terry Robin George Stringer – of Warkworth. For services to sculpture.
- Murray George Sturgeon – of Nelson. For services to the forestry and export industries.
- Tuitofa Anne Tenari – of Auckland. For services to persons with disabilities.
- Dr Kenneth John Thomson – of Wellington. For services to pathology and the community.
- Heinz Ralf Unger – of Christchurch. For services to psychology and the community.
- Dr Richard Anthony Drummond Wigley – of Palmerston North. For services to medicine, in particular, rheumatology.
- Silvia Contreras Zonoobi – of Wellington. For services to refugee and migrant communities.

Honorary

- Thomas Anthony (Tab) Baldwin – of Auckland. For services to basketball.
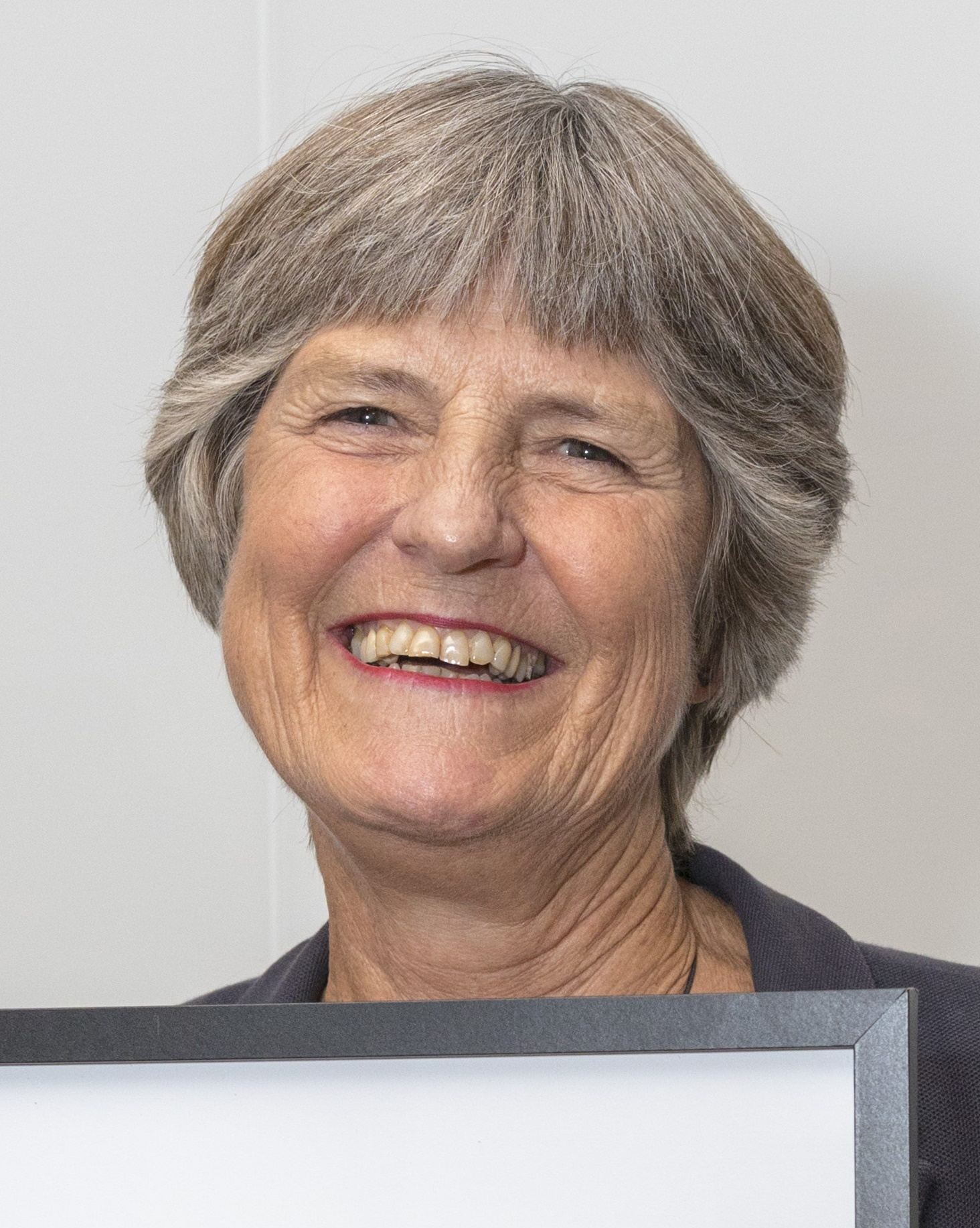
Innes Asher

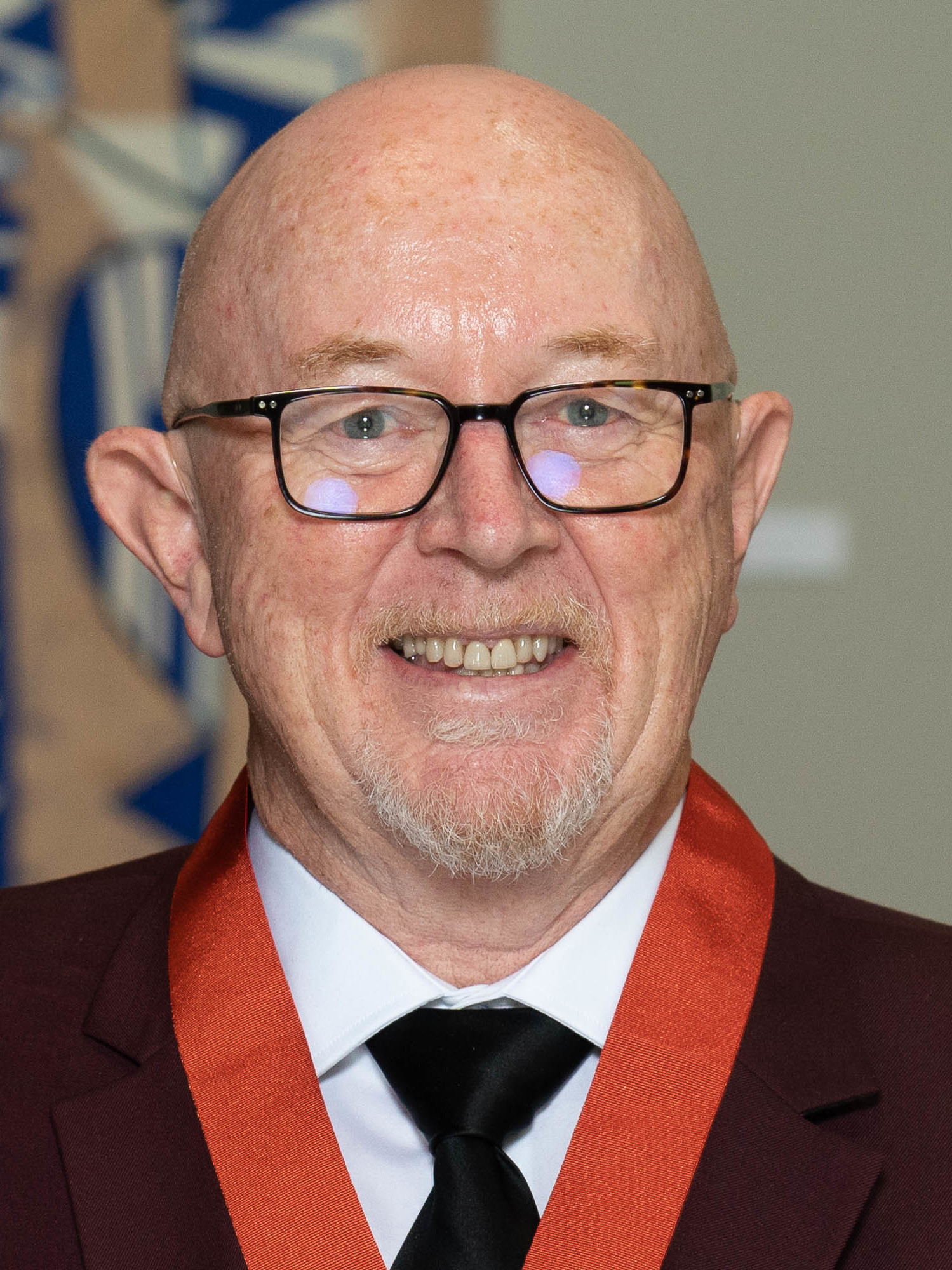
Dave Dobbyn

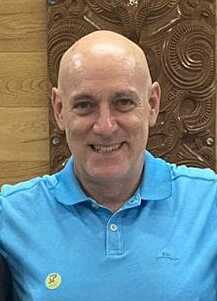
Tab Baldwin

=== Member (MNZM) ===
- Warrant Officer Yeoman of Signals Rawiri George Ahuriri – Royal New Zealand Navy.
- Donna Lindsay Akersten – of Wellington. For services to acting.
- Elizabeth Margaret Bang – of Hamilton. For services to women and the community.
- Wing Commander Stephen Craig John Basher – Royal New Zealand Air Force.
- George Latham Berry – of Oamaru. For services to education.
- Betty Blair – of Petone. For services to railway superannuitants and netball.
- The Reverend David Hilliard Brown – of Dunedin. For services to the community.
- Dr John Herbert Buckingham – of Auckland. For services to science and technology.
- Helen Beverley Capel – of Auckland. For services to the community.
- Kathryn Heather Barbara Clemans – of Bethesda, United States of America. For services to New Zealand interests in the United States of America.
- Shirley Dawn Cowles – of Christchurch. For services to women's cricket.
- William Ian Cruden – of Palmerston North. For services to sport, local-body and community affairs.
- Anoma Indira De Silva JP – of Waitakere City. For services to the community.
- Allan Stewart Doak Evans – of Temuka For services to conservation.
- Michael Bryant Forbes – of Auckland. For services to journalism.
- Nola Louise Hambleton – of Manukau City. For services to education.
- Derek John Hargreaves – of Christchurch. For services to the arts.
- Clifford William Hawkins – of North Shore City. For services to maritime history.
- Christopher Gerard Hayward – of Auckland. For services to water polo.
- Elizabeth Mary Hickey – of Auckland. For services to guides and netball.
- Owen Erle Hoskin JP – of Auckland. For services to education and the community.
- John Charles La Roche – of Auckland. For services to engineering.
- Barbara Elaine Lawrence – of Waiuku. For services to the Methodist Church and the community.
- Olive Kathleen Alice Luke JP – of Ngāruawāhia. For services to welfare work and the community.
- George Richmond Lyon JP – of Richmond. For services to conservation.
- Dr Rachel Emily Maule – of Auckland. For services to psychiatric medicine and the community.
- Colin Bruce McLachlan – of Christchurch. For services to the community.
- Bernice Papasina Mene – of Auckland. For services to netball.
- Panaghis (Peter) Mikelatos – of Wellington. For services to the Greek community.
- Guy Kingdon Natusch DSC – of Napier. For services to architecture.
- David John Ogg – of Gore. For services to the community.
- Diana Mary Petersen JP – of Waipukurau. For services to local-body and community affairs.
- David Charles Proud – of Tauranga. For services to music and the community.
- The Reverend Graham Hamilton Reddell JP – of Christchurch. For services to the community.
- Dr Richard Peter Gorton Rothwell – of Hamilton. For services to medicine.
- Kinsley Neville Sampson JP – of New Plymouth. For services to local government.
- Colin Scadden – of Masterton. For services to conservation.
- Margaret Lynne Sherriff – of Wanganui. For services to the community.
- Lieutenant Colonel Diane Sarah Swap – Royal New Zealand Nursing Corps (Retired).
- 'Elisapeti Tevi – of Auckland. For services to the Pacific Islands community.
- Grace Thompson – of Dunedin. For services to the community.
- Professor Raymond Webster Thompson – of Lower Hutt. For services to television and entertainment.
- Richard William Tonks – of Cambridge. For services to rowing.
- Francis Desmond Torley – of Waikanae. For services to television.
- Russell James Towns – of Dunedin. For services to the sport of fencing and the community.
- Dr Ivanica Mary Vodanovich – of Auckland. For services to development studies.
- Wi Rangi Wiremu Whaitiri JP – of Clive. For services to Māori.
- Jeffrey William Wilson – of Dunedin. For services to rugby.
- Commander David Charles Wright – Royal New Zealand Navy.

Additional

- Major Darryl Jeffrey Hubbard – The Corps of Royal New Zealand Engineers.
- Captain Michael Allan Pettersen – The Corps of Royal New Zealand Engineers.
- Warrant Officer Class One Wayne Alexander Lee Small – Royal New Zealand Army Logistic Regiment.
- Staff Sergeant Adrian Garry Vogt – Royal New Zealand Infantry Regiment.
- Staff Sergeant Graeme Paul Weavers – Royal New Zealand Infantry Regiment.
- Flight Sergeant David James Milne – Royal New Zealand Air Force.
- Sergeant Stephen Rawhiti Waerea – Royal New Zealand Infantry Regiment.

Honorary

- Guy Gabriel Edouard Cornelius Gruwez OBE OAM MSM – of Ypres, Belgium. For services to preserving the memory of New Zealand soldiers who died in the Great War.
- Elizabeth Peivi Alice Lee-Lo Smith – of Porirua. For services to the community.
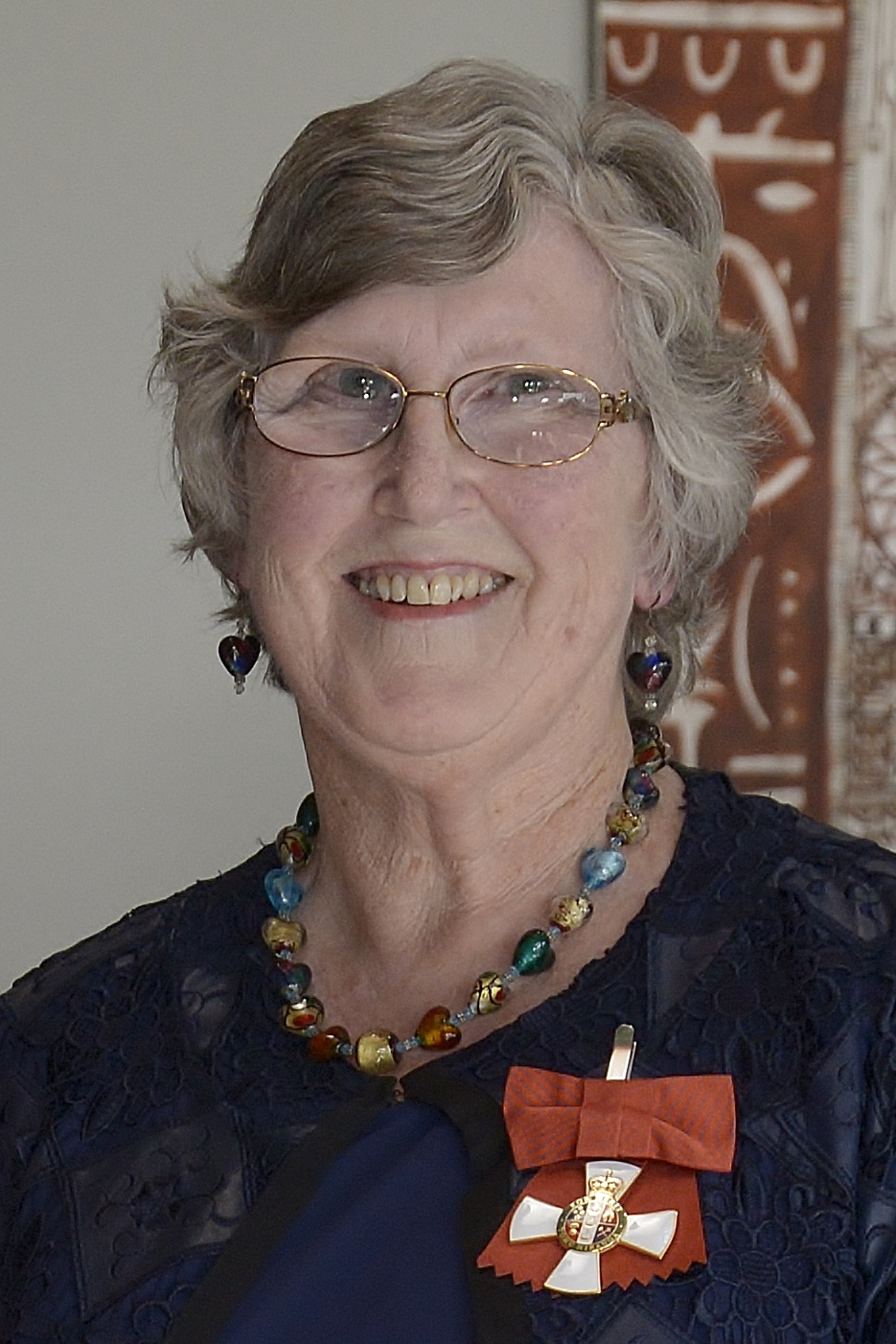
Elizabeth Bang

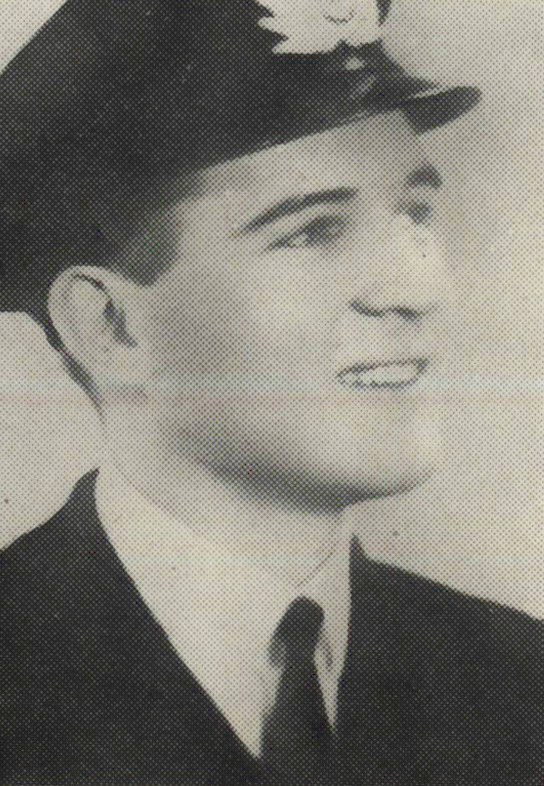
Guy Natusch

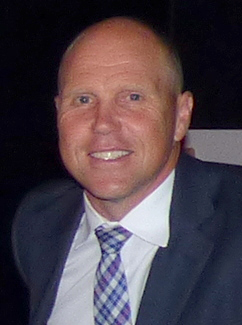
Jeff Wilson

== Companion of the Queen's Service Order (QSO) ==
=== For community service ===
- The Reverend Archdeacon Wallace (Warihi) Mangu Campbell – of Wainuiomata.
- The Reverend William Cuthers JP – of Tokoroa.
- Ewen James Derrick – of North Shore City.
- The Reverend Elder Risatisone Ete – of Wellington.
- Valerie June Rhodes – of Wellington.
- Katerina Catherine Mary Waiari – of Edgecumbe.
- Margaret Grace Wheeler – of Masterton.

=== For public services ===
- Teata Rangi Matua Kore Allen – of Takapau.
- Colin Stewart Ballantyne – of Winton.
- Basil Franklin Bolt – of Vienna, Austria.
- Geoffrey Bernard Braybrooke JP – of Levin.
- Beverley Fay Mason JP – of North Shore City.
- Dr Rajen Prasad – of Auckland.
- Russell Mathew Rimmington JP – of Hamilton.
- Alison Vale Stokes – of Wellington.
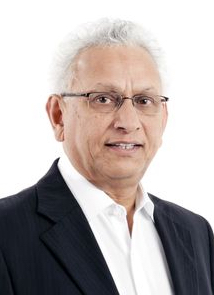
Rajen Prasad

== Queen's Service Medal (QSM) ==
=== For community service ===
- Sonia Christine Andrews – of Auckland.
- Keith McChesney Ashley – of Gore.
- Marianne Johanna Bodt – of Auckland.
- Beverley-Inez Christie – of Invercargill.
- William Henry Cross – of Balclutha.
- Betty Greig Cuthbert – of North Shore City.
- Ivan Desmond England – of Lower Hutt.
- Margaret Dorothea (Rosemary) Greene – of Christchurch.
- Gwynedd Vida Gunn – of Paraparaumu Beach.
- Patricia Ann Hotter – of Tūrangi.
- Winsome Helen Humphries – of Wyndham.
- Limaono Folautolutama Kingi – of Auckland.
- Jack Campbell Knight JP – of Owaka.
- Mazhar Shukri Krasniqi – of Auckland.
- Roberta May Laurie – of Waimate.
- Nellie Martin – of Kerikeri.
- Kingi Matthews – of Greytown.
- Edward George McInnes – of Oamaru.
- Elizabeth Heather Pennell – of Opononi.
- Margreta Hilary Peterson – of Wellington.
- Mosammat Begum Farida Sultana – of Auckland.
- Sinnakuddy Kandavanam Thuraisundaram JP – of Auckland.
- Manuera Hone Tohu – of Dargaville.
- Peter Hans Vollweiler – of Waihola.
- Mere Walker JP – of Kawerau.
- Henry (Harry) Stewart Walsh – of Masterton.
- Helen Fergusson Webber – of Nelson.
- Norman George Williams – of Lower Hutt.
- Velma Beatrice Winter – of Warkworth.
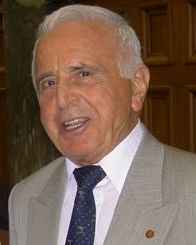
Mazhar Krasniqi

=== For public services ===
- Alan Laurence Anderson JP – of Auckland.
- Beatrice (Sheila) Annie Ashley – of Auckland.
- Leah Braham – of Wellington.
- Janice Rae Burns – of Riversdale Beach.
- Aleana Anne Cannons – of Manukau City.
- Russell Edward Martin Carr – of Queenstown.
- Barry John Clark – of Christchurch.
- Maxwell David Charles Dowell – of Hokitika.
- Gladstone James Orlando Durham – of Auckland.
- Olwyn Domett Frith – of Orewa.
- The Reverend William Pokura Hakaoro JP – of Auckland.
- Leonard Patrick Harwood – of Taumarunui.
- Ani Hemara – of Hikurangi.
- Paul Desmond Hudson – of Marton; chief fire officer, Marton Volunteer Fire Brigade.
- Maud Makuini Isaac – of Gisborne.
- (Valerie) Anne Knox – of New Plymouth; inspector, New Zealand Police.
- Grant Phillip Lane – of Kaeo.
- Nancy Louise Lane – of Kaeo.
- Ian Chappell Mackley – of Lower Hutt.
- James Peter Maxwell – of Thames; third officer, Thames Volunteer Fire Brigade.
- Ngaire Winifred Mountfort – of Woodville.
- Robert Philip Alexander Patton – of Tauranga.
- Brian Ronald Pearce – of Christchurch; detective inspector, New Zealand Police.
- John Balfour Pickering – of Picton; lately senior constable, New Zealand Police.
- Joan Elizabeth Porteous – of Lyttelton.
- Leslie John Pye – of Blenheim.
- June Elvira Rowland – of Raumati Beach.
- Annette Maree Samson JP – of Christchurch.
- Barry John Shiels – of Whakatāne; senior constable, New Zealand Police.
- Andrew Denis Sissons – of Wellington; sergeant, New Zealand Police.
- Clifford James Harris Smith – of Auckland.
- Gary Neil Phillip Tonkin JP – of Christchurch.
- Maree Ann Vaile – of Westport.
- Stewart George Walker – of Lower Hutt; chief fire officer, Stokes Valley Volunteer Fire Brigade.
- Mark David John Williams – of Auckland; detective sergeant, New Zealand Police.
- Bronwyn Ruth Naumai Yates – of Auckland.
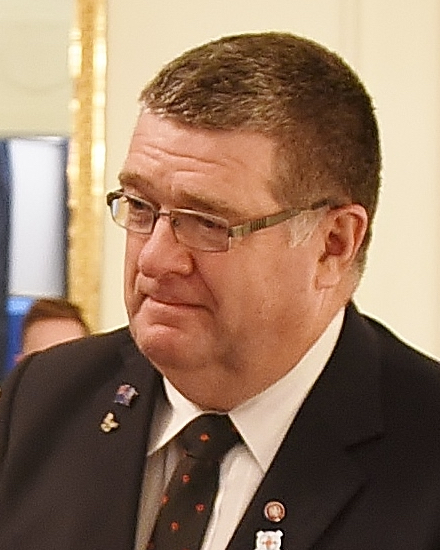
BJ Clark
