= Matire Harwood =

New Zealand physician

Matire Harwood KSM
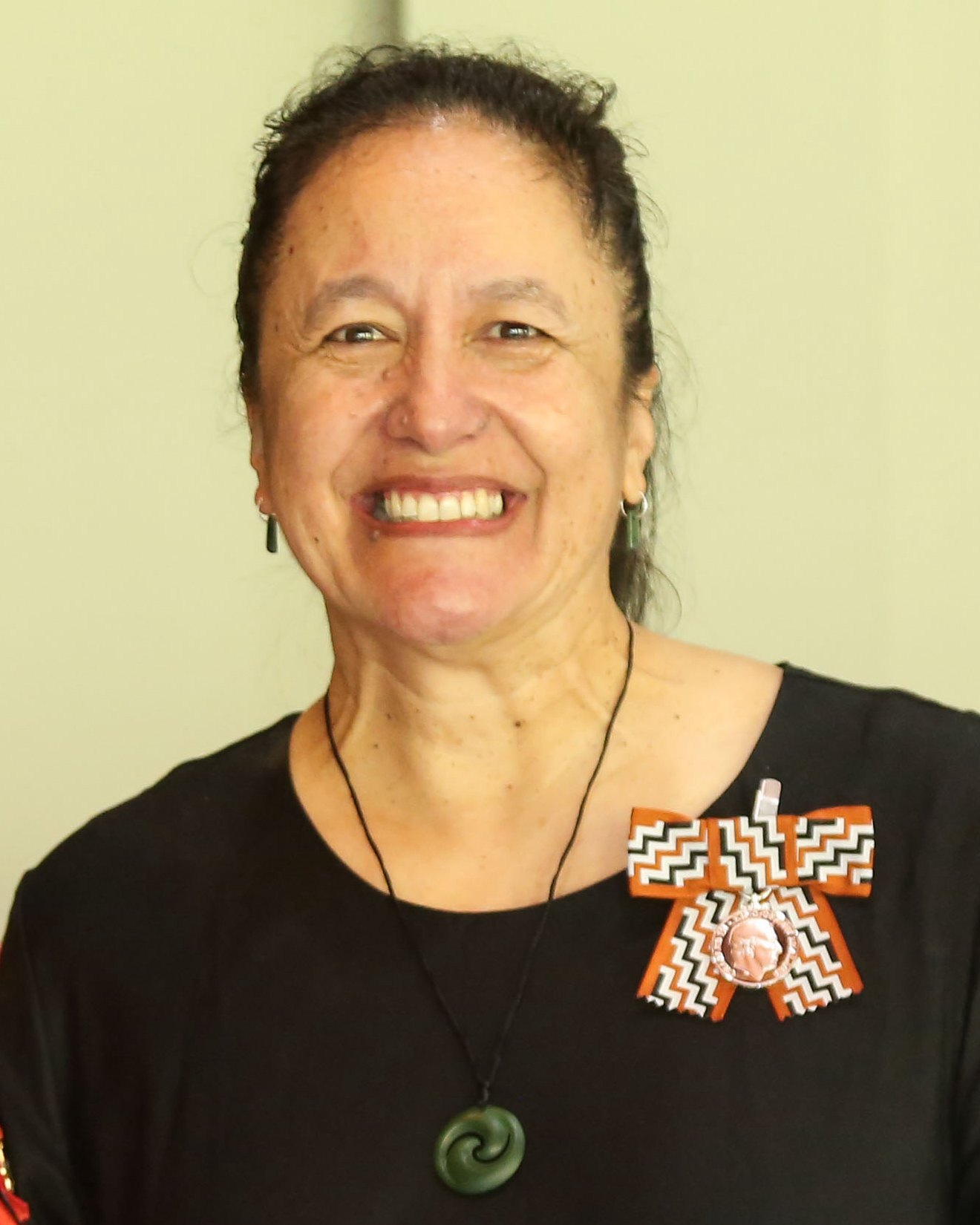
- Harwood in 2024
- Born: 1970 (age 55–56)
- Education: University of Auckland (MBChB); University of Otago (PhD)
- Scientific career
- Fields: Health
- Thesis: Understanding and Improving Stroke Recovery for Māori and Their Whānau (2012)
- Doctoral advisor: Kathryn McPherson; Papaarangi Reid; William J Taylor; Harry McNaughton; Bridget Robson

Matire Louise Ngarongoa Harwood KSM is a New Zealand clinical researcher and trainee general practitioner. She is a professor at the University of Auckland. Harwood was the 2017 New Zealand L'Oréal UNESCO For Women in Science Fellow. Her expertise is in Māori health, focussed on reducing health inequity by improving indigenous health and well-being.

== Early life and education ==
Harwood is from Ngāpuhi with whakapapa links to Ngāti Rangi, Te Mahurehure and Ngāti Hine.

During her childhood, Harwood moved to Australia with her family, where she and her siblings experienced racism due to being Māori.

Harwood attended high school in rural Victoria, Australia, where she studied maths (statistics and calculus), chemistry, physics and English, and was one of the four first female physics students at her school, despite discouragement from the science department and male students. She credits the encouragement of her female science teacher for the success of the female students.

Harwood moved back to New Zealand to study medicine at the University of Auckland, graduating with an MBChB in 1994. No one in her family had previously attended university. She credits the influence of her grandfather, Ngature Matenga Werekake, who inspired her to be a doctor when she was seven years old.

Harwood received a PhD from the University of Otago in 2012, supervised by Kathryn McPherson, Papaarangi Reid, William Taylor, Harry McNaughton and Bridget Robson. Her doctoral research on patient-driven rehabilitation following a stroke developed an intervention designed especially for Māori and Pasifika. The success of this intervention led to changes in treatment guidelines for stroke recovery.

== Personal life ==
Harwood lives in Auckland with her partner Haunui and two young children.

== Career ==
Harwood is a professor in Māori health at the University of Auckland, where she is the co-director of Tōmaiora - the Māori health research group at Te Kupenga Hauora Māori - and Deputy Dean of the Faculty of Medical and Health Sciences. Her research is focussed on applying Kaupapa Māori (Māori principles) to clinical research. Harwood supervises graduate students at the University of Auckland, as well as training senior medical students in Māori health.

She acts as editor of the Māori Health Review, a publication featuring the latest updates in Māori health research. Her research has been published in scientific journals such as The BMJ , The Lancet Respiratory Medicine, The New Zealand Medical Journal, BMC Public Health, and Disability and Rehabilitation.

In addition to her work as an academic researcher, Harwood practices as a trainee GP at Papakura Marae Health Clinic.

Harwood is the recipient of several national and international awards, including the 2018 Matariki Award, Tūhono for Improving Māori Health, the 2017 New Zealand L'Oréal UNESCO For Women in Science Fellowship, and the 2017 Dr Maarire Goodall Award.

Harwood has served on national health committees, including as a member of the PBRF Assessment Panel (2018 onwards), and the Expert Advisory Group for New Zealand Health Strategy (2018 onwards) and as a board member for the Medical Research Institute of New Zealand (2017 onwards), the Health Research Council (2009–2016), the Waitematā District Health Board (2016 onwards), and the Asthma Respiratory Foundation of New Zealand (2006–2010; 2016 onwards).

In 2019, Harwood was awarded the Health Research Council of New Zealand's Te Tohu Rapuora Award.

During the COVID-19 pandemic in New Zealand, Harwood has been the representative of Te Rōpū Whakakaupapa Urutā National Māori Pandemic Group on the Ministry of Health's COVID-19 Technical Advisory Group.

In the 2024 King's Birthday Honours, Harwood received the King's Service Medal, for services to Māori health.
