= Margaret Dudley =

Margaret Dudley is the name of:

- Makarena Dudley, also known as Margaret Dudley, New Zealand clinical psychologist and dementia researcher
- Margaret Howard, Duchess of Norfolk (1540–1564), second wife of Thomas Howard, 4th Duke of Norfolk
- Rita Childers (1915–2010), second wife of Erskine Hamilton Childers, fourth President of Ireland
