= Nicola Starkey =

New Zealand psychology academic

- Born: Nicola Jayne Starkey
- Education: University of Leeds
- Scientific career
- Fields: Psychology
- Workplaces: University of Waikato
- Thesis: Ethological and pharmacological examination of social behaviour in gerbils (meriones unguicalatus) (2000)

Nicola Jayne Starkey is a New Zealand psychology academic. She is currently a full professor at the University of Waikato.

== Academic career ==
After a 2000 PhD titled 'Ethological and pharmacological examination of social behaviour in gerbils (meriones unguicalatus) ' at the University of Leeds, she moved to the University of Waikato, rising to full professor.

Starkey's research includes traumatic brain injury, strokes and driver behaviour.

== Selected works ==
- Feigin, Valery L., Alice Theadom, Suzanne Barker-Collo, Nicola J. Starkey, Kathryn McPherson, Michael Kahan, Anthony Dowell et al. "Incidence of traumatic brain injury in New Zealand: a population-based study." The Lancet Neurology 12, no. 1 (2013): 53–64.
- Drew, Margaret, Lynette J. Tippett, Nicola J. Starkey, and Robert B. Isler. "Executive dysfunction and cognitive impairment in a large community-based sample with Multiple Sclerosis from New Zealand: a descriptive study." Archives of Clinical Neuropsychology 23, no. 1 (2008): 1–19.
- Bradley, B. F., N. J. Starkey, S. L. Brown, and R. W. Lea. "Anxiolytic effects of Lavandula angustifolia odour on the Mongolian gerbil elevated plus maze." Journal of Ethnopharmacology 111, no. 3 (2007): 517–525.
- Johnston, Marnie, Mary Foster, Jeannette Shennan, Nicola J. Starkey, and Anders Johnson. "The effectiveness of an acceptance and commitment therapy self-help intervention for chronic pain." The Clinical Journal of Pain 26, no. 5 (2010): 393–402.
- Feigin, Valery L., Suzanne Barker-Collo, Rita Krishnamurthi, Alice Theadom, and Nicola Starkey. "Epidemiology of ischaemic stroke and traumatic brain injury." Best Practice & Research Clinical Anaesthesiology 24, no. 4 (2010): 485–494.
