= Leigh Signal =

New Zealand sleep researcher and psychologist

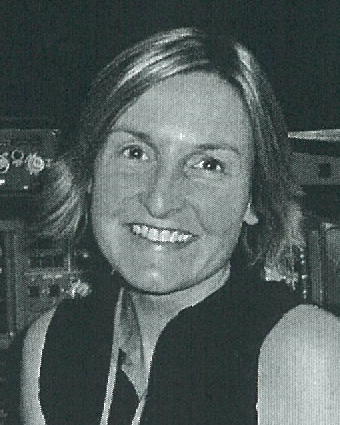
- Signal in 2005

Academic background
- Education: Massey University, Massey University, University of Otago
- Theses: Shiftwork in air traffic services : coping strategies and well-being (1997); Scheduled napping on the night shift : consequences for the performance and neurophysiological alertness of air traffic controllers (2002)
- Doctoral advisor: Philippa Gander

Tracey Leigh Signal is a New Zealand academic, and is a full professor at Massey University, specialising in fatigue and sleep, especially in relation to the aviation industry, and in women and children.

== Academic career ==
Signal trained as a commercial pilot before completing a Master's degree on shiftwork in air traffic services at Massey University, and a PhD in public health at the University of Otago. Her doctoral thesis was titled Scheduled napping on the night shift: consequences for the performance and neurophysiological alertness of air traffic controllers, and was supervised by Philippa Gander. Signal then joined the faculty at Massey, rising to full professor in 2021.

Signal works in the Fatigue Management and Sleep Health group of the Sleep/Wake Centre at Massey University. Her research interests cover two areas, She studies sleep and fatigue avoidance, identification and management in the workplace, particularly in the aviation industry, and in relation to workplace deaths and accidents. She also researches healthy sleep in women and children, changes in sleep that occur at different life stages, and the relationship between sleep and sporting performance. She published a book Sleeping better in pregnancy after experiencing problems sleeping during her own second pregnancy.

Signal has been an invited member of two International Civil Aviation Organisation Fatigue Risk Management Task Forces, and has contributed to national and global standards on civil aviation. She has provided expert advice to the Coroner's Office, WorkSafe New Zealand and to the Transport Accident Investigation Commission.

== Selected works ==
- Signal, Tracey Leigh; Jesse Gale; Gander, Philippa Helen (2005). "Sleep measurement in flight crew: comparing actigraphic and subjective estimates to polysomnography". Aerospace Medicine and Human Performance. 76 (11): 1058–1063. PMID 16313142. Wikidata Q48522897.
- Signal, Tracey Leigh; Gander, Philippa Helen; Michel R Sangalli; Travier, Noemie; Firestone, Ridvan; Jeremy Tuohy (2007). "Sleep duration and quality in healthy nulliparous and multiparous women across pregnancy and post-partum". Australian and New Zealand Journal of Obstetrics and Gynaecology. 47 (1): 16–22. doi:10.1111/j.1479-828x.2006.00672.x. PMID 17261094. Wikidata Q48479061.
- Signal, Tracey Leigh; Gander, Philippa Helen; Howard Anderson; Sue Brash (2009). "Scheduled napping as a countermeasure to sleepiness in air traffic controllers". Journal of Sleep Research. 18 (1): 11–19. doi:10.1111/j.1365-2869.2008.00702.x. PMID 19250171. Wikidata Q45783189.
- Gander, Philippa Helen; Signal, Tracey Leigh (2008). "Who is too old for shift work? Developing better criteria". Chronobiology International. 25 (2): 199–213. doi:10.1080/07420520802077556. PMID 18484361. Wikidata Q48434874.
- Gander, Philippa Helen; van den Berg, Margo; Signal, Tracey Leigh (2008). "Sleep and sleepiness of fishermen on rotating schedules". Chronobiology International. 25 (2): 389–398. doi:10.1080/07420520802106728. PMID 18533331. Wikidata Q48433182.
