= Denise Wilson =

New Zealand health academic

Denise Lucy Wilson
- Education: Massey University
- Scientific career
- Workplaces: Auckland University of Technology
- Thesis: Ngā kairaranga oranga / The weavers of health and wellbeing : a grounded theory study (2004)

Denise Lucy Wilson is a New Zealand health academic. She is currently a full professor of Māori health at the Auckland University of Technology. She is a fellow of the Royal Society Te Apārangi, and in 2026 was awarded the Te Tohu Rapuora Medal by the Health Research Council of New Zealand.

== Academic career ==
After a background in nursing Wilson did an MSc titled 'Through the looking glass: nurses' responses to women experiencing partner abuse' and PhD titled 'Ngā kairaranga oranga / The weavers of health and wellbeing: a grounded theory study' at the Massey University. She then moved to the Auckland University of Technology, rising to full professor.

She has received media coverage for her work on domestic violence. Wilson leads a Marsden-funded research project on how Māori women stay safe in relationships. She has held a number of roles including as a member of a ministerial advisory group for family violence and sexual violence prevention, the Family Violence Death Review Committee, the Family Violence Prevention Investment Advisory Board, and the Family Violence Prevention Expert Advisory Group.

In 2024, Wilson published a book, A Litany of Sound Revisited, which she described as a roadmap for the elimination of Māori family and sexual violence.

== Awards ==
In 2019 Wilson was elected a fellow of the American Academy of Nursing. In March 2021, she was made a fellow of the Royal Society Te Apārangi, recognising her research is "greatly contributing to efforts to reduce health disparities of Māori and other Indigenous people globally". In October 2206, Wilson was awarded the Health Research Council's Te Tohu Rapuora Medal, for "outstanding Māori health leadership, excellence, and contributions". The citation noted her contributions towards the understanding of how cultural harm can stem from mainstream systems, and to the Glenn Inquiry into Child Abuse and Domestic Violence.

== Selected works ==
- Wilson, Denise, and Stephen Neville. "Culturally safe research with vulnerable populations." Contemporary Nurse 33, no. 1 (2009): 69–79.
- Huntington, Annette, Jean Gilmour, Anthony Tuckett, Stephen Neville, Denise Wilson, and Catherine Turner. "Is anybody listening? A qualitative study of nurses' reflections on practice." Journal of Clinical Nursing 20, no. 9‐10 (2011): 1413–1422.
- Wilson, Denise. "The significance of a culturally appropriate health service for Indigenous Māori women." Contemporary Nurse 28, no. 1-2 (2008): 173–188.
- Wilson, Denise, and Stephen Neville. "Nursing their way not our way: Working with vulnerable and marginalised populations." Contemporary Nurse 27, no. 2 (2008): 165–176.
- Wilson, Denise, and Pipi Barton. "Indigenous hospital experiences: a New Zealand case study." Journal of Clinical Nursing 21, no. 15‐16 (2012): 2316–2326.

== Personal life ==
Wilson is Māori, of Ngāti Tahinga descent.
