= Alice Theadom =

English-born New Zealand psychologist and academic

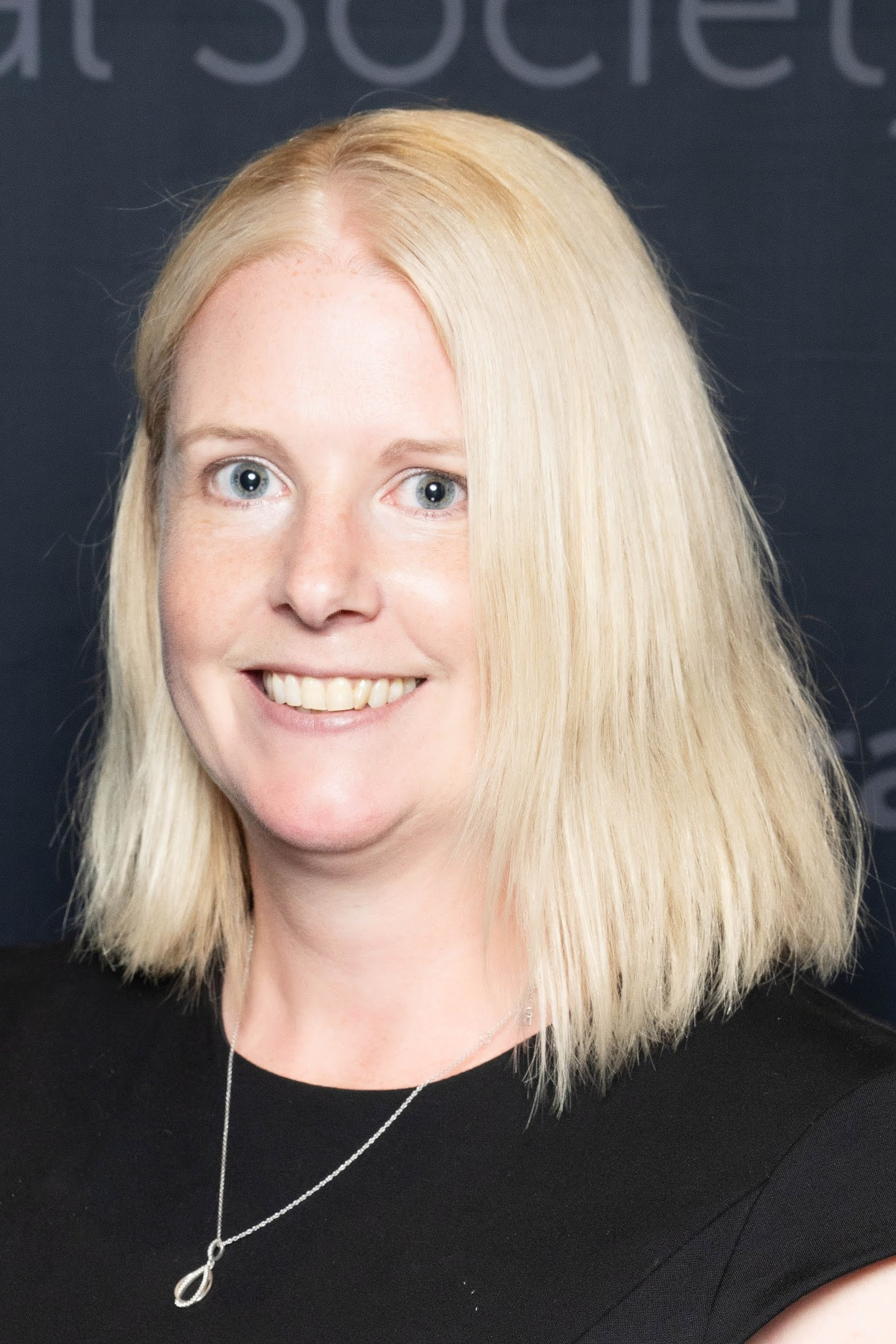
- Theadom in 2025
- Education: University of Essex; University of Surrey
- Alma mater: Auckland University of Technology
- Scientific career
- Workplaces: Auckland University of Technology

Alice M. Theadom is an English-born New Zealand psychologist and academic. As of 2020 she is a full professor and Rutherford Discovery Fellow at Auckland University of Technology (AUT).

== Academic career ==
Theadom completed a BSc (psychology) at the University of Essex, followed by an MSc in Health Psychology at the University of Surrey. She moved to New Zealand to take up a position as associate professor at Auckland University of Technology from May 2009 and completed a PhD at the same university in 2011.

Theadom won AUT's emerging researcher award for academic excellence in research in 2013. In 2018 she was awarded a Rutherford Discovery Fellowship by the Royal Society Te Apārangi.

In late 2019 she was appointed full professor at AUT.

== Selected works ==
- Alice Theadom; Cropley, Mark; Parmar, Priya; Barker, Suzanne Lyn; Starkey, Nicola; Jones, Kelly Marie; Feigin, Valery L.; BIONIC Research Group (2015). "Sleep difficulties one year following mild traumatic brain injury in a population-based study". Sleep Medicine. 16 (8): 926–932. doi:10.1016/j.sleep.2015.04.013. PMID 26138280. Wikidata Q41617723.
- Alice Theadom; Rutherford, Sandy; Bruce Kent; McPherson, Kathryn Margaret; ARCOS IV Group (2018). "The process of adjustment over time following stroke: A longitudinal qualitative study". Neuropsychological Rehabilitation: 1–11. doi:10.1080/09602011.2018.1440609. PMID 29480073. Wikidata Q52685721.
- Alice Theadom; Barker, Suzanne Lyn; Jones, Kelly Marie; P Parmar; R Bhattacharjee; Feigin, Valery L. (2018). "MLC901 (NeuroAiD II™) for cognition after traumatic brain injury: a pilot randomized clinical trial". European Journal of Neurology. doi:10.1111/ene.13653. PMC 6055867. PMID 29611892. Wikidata Q52333613.
- Alice Theadom; Richard Roxburgh; Erin MacAulay; et al. (2019). "Prevalence of Charcot-Marie-Tooth disease across the lifespan: a population-based epidemiological study". BMJ Open. 9 (6) e029240. doi:10.1136/bmjopen-2019-029240. PMC 6585838. PMID 31203252. Wikidata Q92774717.
- Maureen O'Reilly; Susan Mahon; Reid, Duncan; Hume, Patria Anne; Natalie Hardaker; Alice Theadom (2020). "Knowledge, attitudes, and behavior toward concussion in adult cyclists". Brain Injury: 1–8. doi:10.1080/02699052.2020.1793386. PMID 32683900. Wikidata Q97591395.
