= Riz Tupai-Firestone =

New Zealand professor of public health

Academic background
- Education: Massey University, University of Canterbury
- Thesis: Obstructive sleep apnoea syndrome among taxi drivers: consequences and barriers to accessing health services (2006)
- Doctoral advisor: Philippa Gander

Ridvan Tupai-Firestone (known as Riz) is a Samoan–New Zealand academic, and from January 2025 is a full professor in the Centre for Public Health Research at Massey University. Tupai-Firestone works on social and cultural health inequalities.

== Early life and education ==
Tupai-Firestone was born in Samoa, and moved to New Zealand with her family in 1976. She has links to the villages of Falealupo on Savai'i island and Matautu on Falealili. Tupai-Firestone completed a Bachelor of Speech and Language Therapy at the University of Canterbury and then a PhD titled Obstructive sleep apnoea syndrome among taxi drivers: consequences and barriers to accessing health services at the Massey University.

== Academic career ==
Tupai-Firestone joined the faculty of Massey University, rising to associate professor in 2021 and full professor in 2025. She first worked in sleep science at the Moe Tika Moe Pai SleepWake Research Centre before focusing on public health. She is interested in social-cultural and health inequalities, community interventions for obesity and other diet-related health problems, and works with young Pacific people with non-communicable diseases. In 2020 she was awarded a Marsden grant to lead a team from five institutions to investigate associations between culture, food systems, diet and traditional practices, and diet-related diseases.

Tupai-Firestone was the Pacific Strategy Leader for the A Better Start National Science Challenge, and was also part of the Healthier Lives challenge.

She was appointed Chair of the Lottery Health Research Committee in 2020. She was also on the jury of the 2024 Falling Walls Lab.

== Awards ==
In 2014 Tupai-Firestone was awarded the New Zealand Health Research Council's Sir Thomas Davis Te Patu Kite Rangi Ariki Health Research Fellowship.

== Selected works ==
- Eyles, Helen; Jull, Andrew; Dobson, Rosie; Firestone, Ridvan; Whittaker, Robyn; Lisa Te Morenga; Debbie Goodwin; Cliona Ni Mhurchu (2016). "Co-design of mHealth Delivered Interventions: A Systematic Review to Assess Key Methods and Processes". Current Nutrition Reports. 5 (3): 160–167. doi:10.1007/s13668-016-0165-7. Wikidata Q57752640.
- Lisa Te Morenga; Crystal Pekepo; Callie Corrigan; et al. (2018). "Co-designing an mHealth tool in the New Zealand Māori community with a "Kaupapa Māori" approach". AlterNative. 14 (1): 90–99. doi:10.1177/1177180117753169. Wikidata Q60441829.
- Paolo Bajardi; Daniela Paolotti; Vespignani, Alessandro; et al. (2014). "Association between recruitment methods and attrition in Internet-based studies". PLOS One. 9 (12) e114925. Bibcode:2014PLoSO...9k4925B. doi:10.1371/journal.pone.0114925. PMC 4260912. PMID 25490045. Wikidata Q34663234.
- Fiona McKenzie; Ellison, Lis; Jeffreys, Mona; Firestone, Ridvan; Pearce, Neil Edward; Isabelle Romieu (2014). "Healthy lifestyle and risk of breast cancer for indigenous and non-indigenous women in New Zealand: a case control study". BMC Cancer. 14: 12. doi:10.1186/1471-2407-14-12. PMC 3893580. PMID 24410858. Wikidata Q41874946.
- Firestone, Ridvan; Philippa H. Gander (2010). "Exploring knowledge and attitudes of taxi drivers with regard to obstructive sleep apnoea syndrome". The New Zealand Medical Journal. 123 (1321): 24–33. PMID 20927154. Wikidata Q48337612.
- Firestone, Ridvan; Cheng, Soo; Pearce, Neil Edward; Douwes, Jeroen; Franco Merletti; Pizzi, Costanza; Pivetta, Emanuele; Rusconi, Franca; Richiardi, Lorenzo (2015). "Internet-Based Birth-Cohort Studies: Is This the Future for Epidemiology?". JMIR Research Protocols. 4 (2): e71. doi:10.2196/resprot.3873. PMC 4526937. PMID 26071071. Wikidata Q35922372.
