= Papaarangi Reid =

New Zealand public health academic (born 1954)

- Born: Papaarangi Mary-Jane Reid; 1954 (age 71–72)
- Education: University of Auckland
- Scientific career
- Fields: public health medicine
- Workplaces: University of Auckland
- Doctoral students: Matire Harwood

Papaarangi Mary-Jane Reid (born 1954) is a New Zealand public health academic and, as of 2019, is a full professor at the University of Auckland.

== Academic career ==
She has served as Tumuaki (Deputy Dean – Māori) and Head of Te Kupenga Hauora Māori at the University of Auckland's Faculty of Medical and Health Sciences since 2006. A graduate in science and medicine, with postgraduate qualifications in obstetrics and community health, she is a Fellow of the New Zealand College of Public Health Medicine. Papaarangi is known for her advocacy on health inequities for Māori and other Indigenous peoples, focusing on increasing Māori and Pacifica representation in health professions and improving the cultural safety of healthcare in New Zealand.

Notable students include Matire Harwood.

In 2007 Reid won the Public Health Association's Tū Rangatira mō te Ora award.

Reid is one of the founders and co-leaders of Te Rōpū Whakakaupapa Urutā, the National Māori Pandemic Group, set up in March 2020 in response to the COVID-19 pandemic in New Zealand.

== Research ==
Papaaragni Reid and other researchers conducted a research study published in 2022 to access the health inequities that indigenous people in New Zealand face. The study was made to determine in which areas in the health department do the Māori people suffer the most with and find ways to achieve equality between Indigenous and non-indigenous people. Data was obtained from the New Zealand government regarding hospitalization, mortality and other factors for adults aged over 15 years old, from 2003-2014. The results conducted that health inequities between Māori and non- Māori are estimated at NZ$863 million and are divided into direct and indirect cost. Underutilization of healthcare benefits the government and negatively impacts the health factor of the Māori.

== Selected works ==
- Reid, Papaarangi, and Bridget Robson. "Understanding health inequities." Hauora: Māori Standards of Health IV. A study of the years 2005 (2000): 3–10.
- Merry, Alan F., Craig S. Webster, Jacqueline Hannam, Simon J. Mitchell, Robert Henderson, Papaarangi Reid, Kylie-Ellen Edwards et al. "Multimodal system designed to reduce errors in recording and administration of drugs in anaesthesia: prospective randomised clinical evaluation." Bmj 343 (2011): d5543.
- Gander, Philippa H., Nathaniel S. Marshall, Ricci Harris, and Papaarangi Reid. "The Epworth Sleepiness Scale: influence of age, ethnicity, and socioeconomic deprivation. Epworth Sleepiness scores of adults in New Zealand." Sleep 28, no. 2 (2005): 249–254.
- Paine, Sarah-Jane, Philippa H. Gander, Ricci Harris, and Papaarangi Reid. "Who reports insomnia? Relationships with age, sex, ethnicity, and socioeconomic deprivation." Sleep 27, no. 6 (2004): 1163–1169.
- Duncanson, Mavis, Alistair Woodward, and Papaarangi Reid. "Socioeconomic deprivation and fatal unintentional domestic fire incidents in New Zealand 1993–1998." Fire Safety Journal 37, no. 2 (2002): 165–179.

== Personal life ==
Reid is of the Te Rarawa iwi.
