= Philippa Gander =

New Zealand sleep researcher

Philippa Gander ONZM
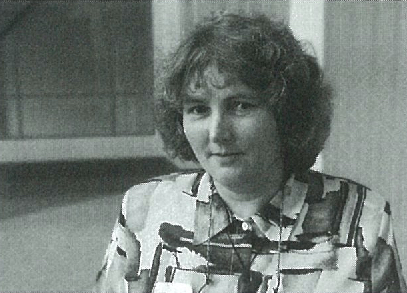
- Gander in 2003
- Education: University of Auckland
- Scientific career
- Fields: Sleep medicine
- Workplaces: Massey University
- Theses: A model for the circadian pacemaker of Hemideina thoracica derived from the effects of temperature on its activity rhythm (1976); Circadian organization in the regulation of locomotor activity and reproduction in Rattus exulans (1980)
- Doctoral students: Leigh Signal, Riz Tupai-Firestone

Philippa Helen Gander ONZM is a New Zealand sleep researcher. In 2021, she was conferred with the title of emeritus professor by Massey University, where she had been inaugural director of the Sleep/Wake Research Centre until stepping down from that role in 2019.

== Academic career ==
Gander wrote her master's thesis at the University of Auckland in 1976 with the title A model for the circadian pacemaker of Hemideina thoracica derived from the effects of temperature on its activity rhythm. After a 1980 PhD titled Circadian organization in the regulation of locomotor activity and reproduction in Rattus exulans at the same institution, Gander took up a Fulbright Fellowship at Harvard Medical School in 1980. She moved to the NASA-Ames Research Center in 1983 as part of the flight crew fatigue and jet-lag research programme. Gander returned to New Zealand in 1998, and established the Sleep/Wake Research Centre at the Wellington School of Medicine with the assistance of funding from the Health Research Council of New Zealand. She moved to Massey University and was appointed a full professor in 2003, and the research centre became part of Massey's newly established research school of public health.

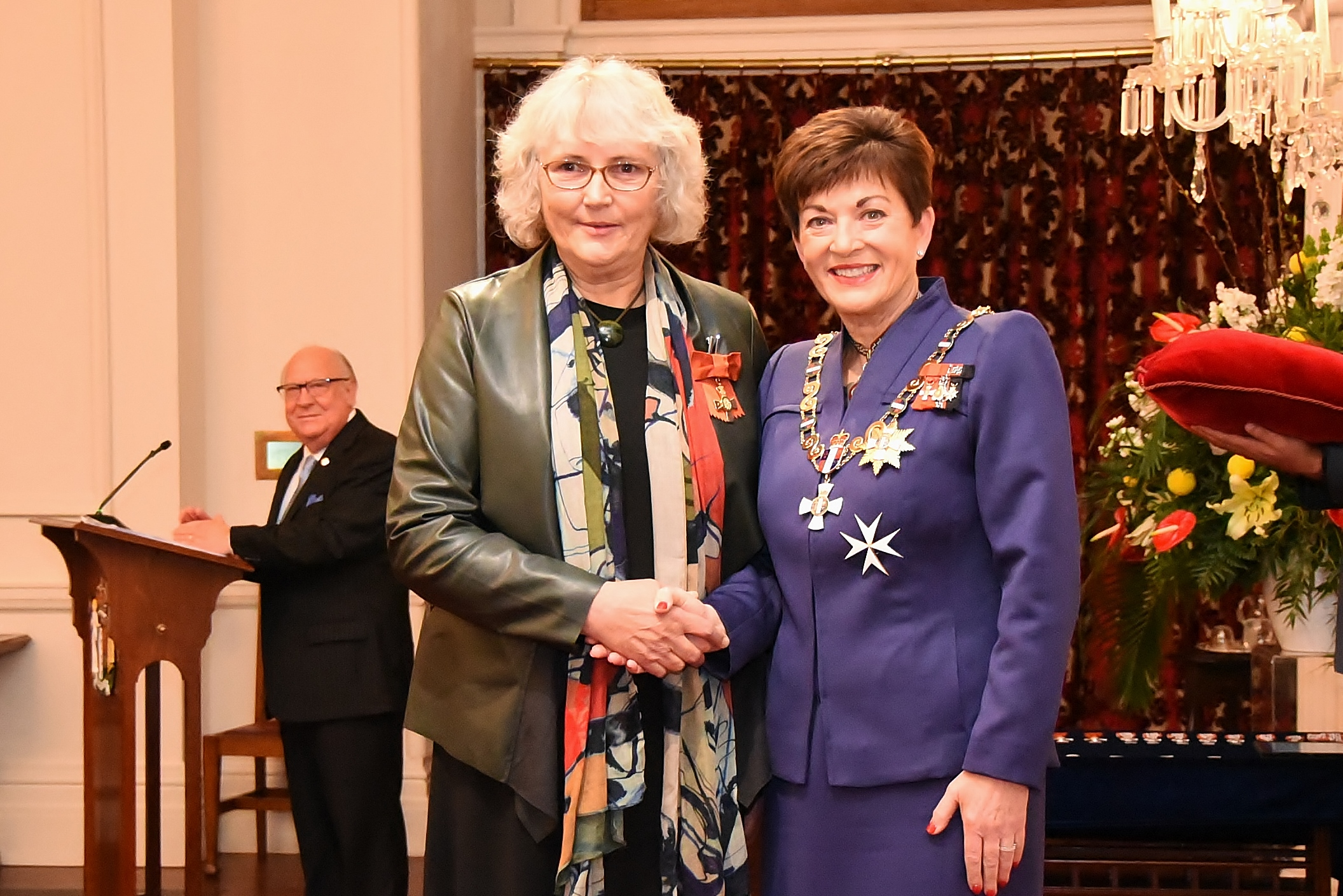
Gander (left), after her investiture as an Officer of the New Zealand Order of Merit by the governor-general, Dame Patsy Reddy, at Government House, Wellington on 31 August 2017

In 2009, Gander was elected a Fellow of the Royal Society of New Zealand. In the 2017 Queen's Birthday Honours, she was appointed an Officer of the New Zealand Order of Merit, for services to the study of sleep and fatigue.

Notable students of Gander's include Leigh Signal and Ridvan Tupai-Firestone, both professors at Massey University.

== Selected works ==
- Paine, Sarah-Jane; Gander, Philippa H.; Travier, Noemie (2006). "The epidemiology of morningness/eveningness: influence of age, gender, ethnicity, and socioeconomic factors in adults (30-49 years)". Journal of Biological Rhythms. 21 (1): 68–76.
- Marshall, Nathaniel Stuart; Barnes, Maree; Travier, Noemie; Campbell, Angela J.; Pierce, Robert J.; McEvoy, R. Doug; Neill, Alister M.; Gander, Philippa Helen (2006). "Continuous positive airway pressure reduces daytime sleepiness in mild to moderate obstructive sleep apnoea: a meta-analysis". Thorax. 61 (5): 430–434.
- Gander, Philippa; Hartley, Laurence; Powell, David; Cabon, Philippe; Hitchcock, Edward; Mills, Ann; Popkin, Stephen (2011). "Fatigue risk management: Organizational factors at the regulatory and industry/company level". Accident Analysis & Prevention. 43 (2): 573–590.
- Rosekind, Mark R.; Smith, Roy M.; Miller, Donna L.; Co, Elizabeth L.; Gregory, Kevin B.; Webbon, Lissa L.; Gander, Philippa H.; Lebacqz, J. Victor (1995). "Alertness management: strategic naps in operational settings". Journal of Sleep Research. 4: 62–66.
- Lilley, Rebbecca; Feyer, Anne-Marie; Kirk, Patrick; Gander, Philippa (2002). "A survey of forest workers in New Zealand: Do hours of work, rest, and recovery play a role in accidents and injury?". Journal of Safety Research. 33 (1): 53–71.
- Signal, T. Leigh; Gale, Jesse; Gander, Philippa H. (2005). "Sleep measurement in flight crew: comparing actigraphic and subjective estimates to polysomnography". Aviation, Space, and Environmental Medicine. 76 (11): 1058–1063.
