= Annette Huntington =

New Zealand nursing academic

Annette Huntington MNZM
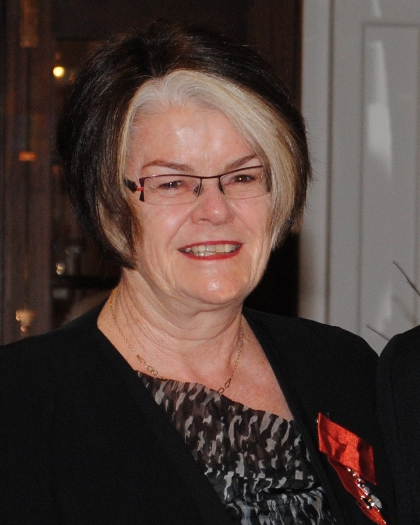
- Huntington in 2012
- Born: 1949 (age 76–77); Lower Hutt, New Zealand
- Other name: Annette Diana Huntington
- Education: Victoria University of Wellington
- Scientific career
- Fields: Nursing research
- Workplaces: Massey University
- Thesis: Blood, Sweat and Tears: Women as Nurses Nursing Women in the Gynaecology Ward - a Feminist Interpretive Study (2000)

Annette Diana Huntington MNZM (born 1949) is a New Zealand nursing academic. She is a professor of nursing and head of school at Massey University and previously served as chair of the Nursing Council of New Zealand.

== Early life ==
Huntington was born in Lower Hutt in 1949.

== Career ==
Huntington became a registered nurse at Auckland Hospital in 1970. After practice as a surgical and later Plunket nurse, she gained a Bachelor of Nursing from Victoria University of Wellington in 1990 - one of the first New Zealanders to receive this qualification - followed by a PhD in nursing from the same institution. Her thesis explored the experiences of nurses as women practising in gynaecological settings, and was one of the first New Zealand doctorates to be awarded specifically in the discipline of nursing.

Huntington began teaching nursing in 1989 at Wellington Polytechnic, joining Massey University after those institutions merged. After being appointed director of the university's nursing programme in 2010, she oversaw nursing's transition to full school status and became head of school in 2013. Under her leadership the Massey University School of Nursing has been the top-ranked nursing faculty for research quality in successive Performance Based Research Fund quality evaluation rounds.

Huntington was an appointed member of the Nursing Council of New Zealand from 2000 to 2006, and chair of the Council from 2001 onwards. As chair she oversaw the complete redesign of nursing regulation in New Zealand following the passage of the Health Practitioners Competence Assurance Act 2003. She was also honorary colonel-commandant of the Royal New Zealand Nursing Corps from 2005 to 2016, and has held a variety of national and international roles, including membership of the Health Practitioners Disciplinary Tribunal, the 2018 Performance Based Research Fund health panel, and the editorial board of The Australian Journal of Nursing Practice, Scholarship and Research. She is a member of the Council of Deans of Nursing and Midwifery, Australia and New Zealand, and was the first New Zealand representative to serve as the Council's deputy chair (2015–2017).

Huntington's research focuses primarily on professional, regulatory, and workforce issues in nursing practice. She was the New Zealand director of both the Nurses and Midwives e-Cohort Study (2006–2014), and the associated Graduate Nurses Study, in collaboration with researchers based in Australia, Canada, Ireland and the United Kingdom. In the 2012 New Year Honours, she was appointed a Member of the New Zealand Order of Merit, becoming the first to receive this honour for contributions to nursing research.

== Selected works ==
- Gander, P., O’Keeffe, K., Santos-Fernandez, E., Huntington, A., & Willis J. (2019). Fatigue and nurses' work patterns: an online questionnaire survey. International Journal of Nursing Studies, 98, October, 67–74. doi:10.1016/j.ijnurstu.2019.06.011
- Huntington, A., & Gilmour, J. (2017). Power and Politics in the Practice of Nursing. Chapter in Daly, J., Speedy, S., & D. Jackson (eds) Contexts of Nursing (5th ed). Churchill Livingstone, Sydney.
- Nursing Council of New Zealand. (2017). Trends in the New Zealand Nursing Workforce: 2012-2016. Wellington: Nursing Council of New Zealand. (commissioned report)
- Jenkins, B.L., & A. Huntington (2016). A missing piece of the workforce puzzle. The experiences of internationally qualified nurses in New Zealand: a literature review. Contemporary Nurse. 51(2-3):220-231. doi:10.1080/10376178.2016.1158079
- Vaka, S., Brannelly, P., & A. Huntington. (2016). Getting to the heart of the story: using Talanoa to explore Pacific Mental Health. Issues in Mental Health Nursing. 37(8):537-544. doi:10.1080/01612840.2016.1186253
- Huntington, Annette, Jean Gilmour, Anthony Tuckett, Stephen Neville, Denise Wilson, and Catherine Turner. "Is anybody listening? A qualitative study of nurses' reflections on practice." Journal of Clinical Nursing 20, no. 9-10 (2011): 1413–1422.
- Huntington, A.D., Gilmour, J. and O’Connell, A. (1996). Reforming the Practice of Nurses: Decolonisation or Getting Out From Under. Journal of Advanced Nursing. 24(2):364-367. doi:10.1046/j.1365-2648.1996.18319.x
