= Nursing Council of New Zealand =

New Zealand professional body

The Nursing Council of New Zealand (NCNZ) is the professional body responsible for the registration of nurses in New Zealand, setting standards for nursing education and practice.

The council was established in 1902. New Zealand was the first country to legally require nurses to be registered. Former heads of the organisation include Annette Huntington who went on to be the head of the school of nursing at Massey University.
