= Elizabeth Bang =

New Zealand nurse

Elizabeth Bang CNZM
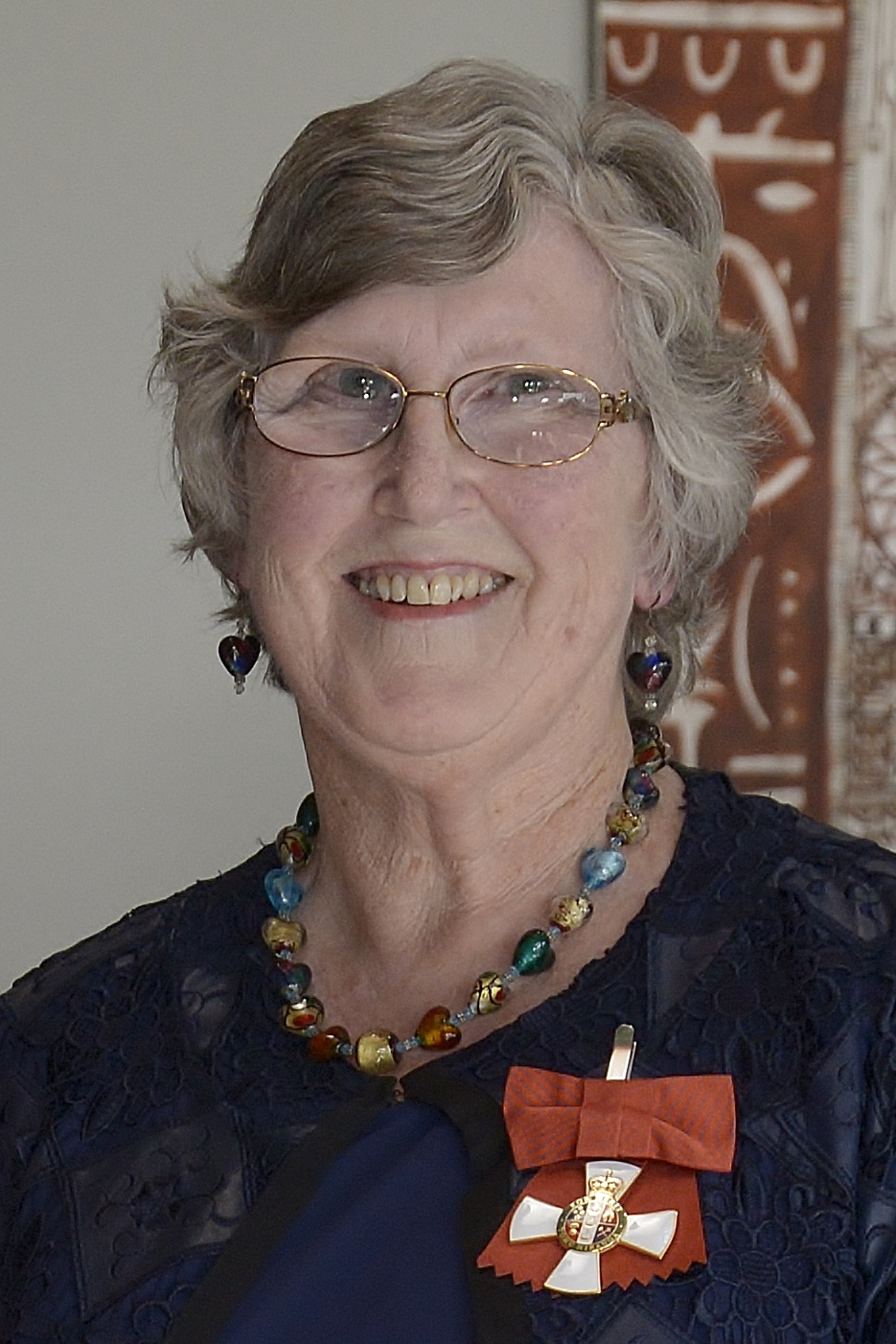
- Bang in 2018
- Born: Elizabeth Margaret Ewart; 1942 (age 83–84)
- Awards: Companion of the New Zealand Order of Merit, Member of the New Zealand Order of Merit

Academic background
- Education: University of Otago

Elizabeth Margaret Bang CNZM (née Ewart; born 1942) is a New Zealand nurse and chief executive. She was the chief executive officer of Hospice Waikato for ten years, and president of the National Council of Women of New Zealand, and is a life member of both organisations. In 2003, Bang was appointed a Member of the New Zealand Order of Merit, for services to women and the community. In 2018, she was promoted to Companion of the New Zealand Order of Merit, for services to health, women and the community.

== Career ==
Bang trained and worked as a nurse. She attended the University of Otago, where she earned a PhD. Bang was the chief executive of Hospice Waikato for ten years, beginning in 2002. She led the fundraising team that purchased and developed the hospice facility in Hamilton, providing improved services for people throughout the Waikato region. She also ensured the creation of a palliative care strategy for the region.

Bang has been a board member and vice president of the National Council of Women of New Zealand, and from 2008 until 2012 she served as president. As president, she spoke about the need for paid parental leave. Bang served on the Waikato Institute of Technology Ethics Committee from 2016, and was chairperson. Bang was made fundraising ambassador for the Waikato Medical Research Foundation in 2013, and has been both a committee member and chair of the Awatere Club, a Waikato-based professional women's network.

== Honours and awards ==
In the 2003 New Year Honours, Bang was appointed a Member of the New Zealand Order of Merit, for services to women and the community. In the 2018 Queen's Birthday Honours, she was promoted to Companion of the New Zealand Order of Merit, for services to health, women and the community. Bang was made a life member of the National Council of Women of New Zealand in 2014, and is also a life member of Hospice Waikato.
