= Riversdale Beach =

Human settlement in New Zealand

- Locality
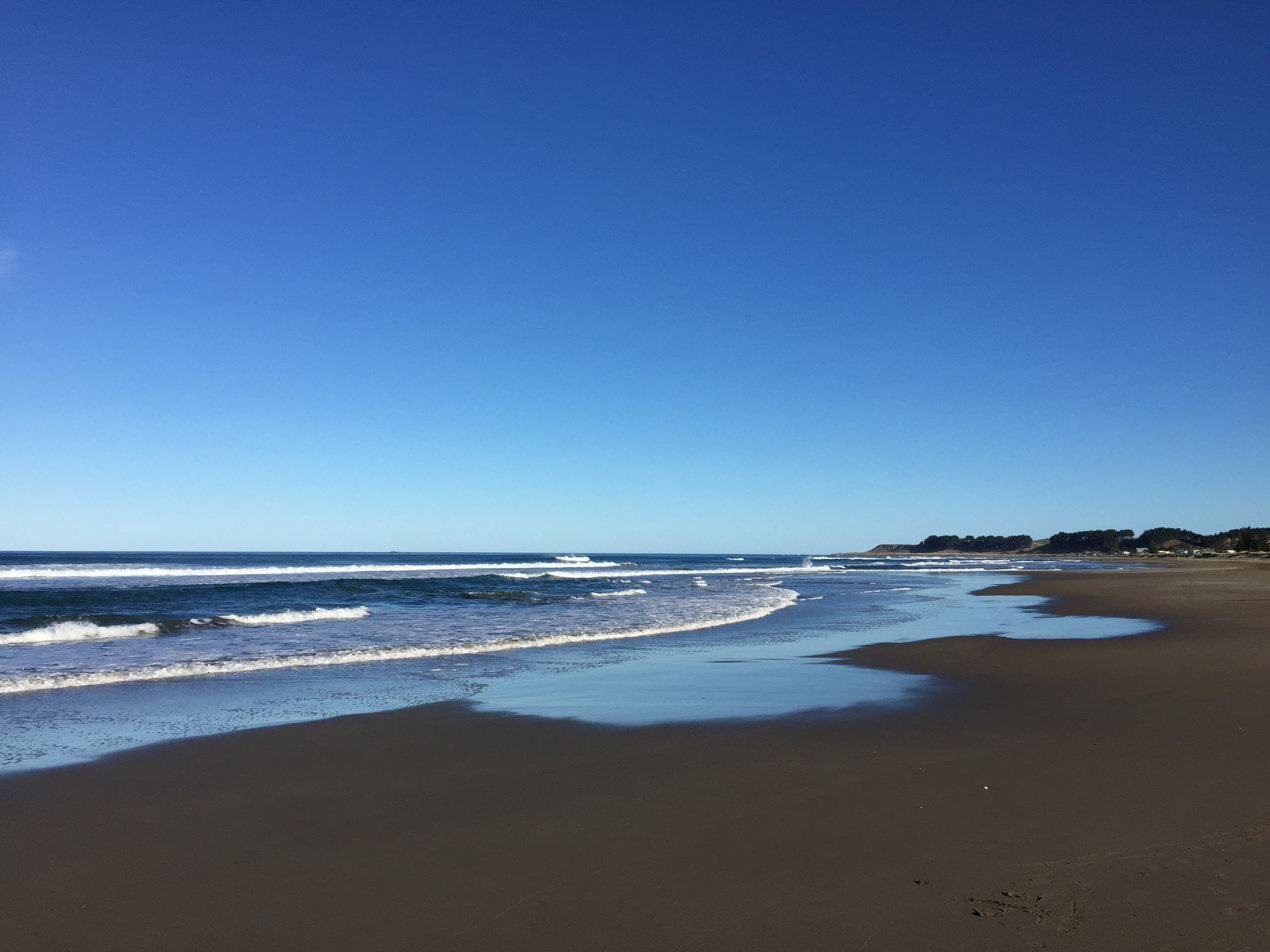
- Riversdale Beach waves
- Interactive map of Riversdale Beach
- Coordinates: 41.0874°S 176.0727°E
- Country: New Zealand
- Region: Wellington Region
- Territorial authority: Masterton District
- Electorates: Wairarapa; Ikaroa-Rāwhiti (Māori)

Government
  - Territorial Authority: Masterton District Council
  - Regional council: Greater Wellington Regional Council
  - Mayor of Masterton: Bex Johnson
  - Wairarapa MP: Mike Butterick
  - Ikaroa-Rāwhiti MP: Cushla Tangaere-Manuel

Area
  - Total: 5.54 km^{2} (2.14 sq mi)

Population (June 2025)
  - Total: 180
  - Density: 32/km^{2} (84/sq mi)

Riversdale Beach is a settlement in New Zealand. It is located on the sparsely populated southeast coast of the North Island, 40 kilometres east of Masterton. It is one of the longest beaches in the Wairarapa and is also known for having a year-round surf.

== Demographics ==
Riversdale Beach covers 5.54 km^{2} (2.14 sq mi). It had an estimated population of 180 as of June 2025, with a population density of 222 people per km^{2}. Riversdale Beach is part of the Whareama statistical area.

Historical population
Year	Pop.	±% p.a.
2013	78	—
2018	111	+7.31%
2023	159	+7.45%

Riversdale Beach had a population of 159 in the 2023 New Zealand census, an increase of 48 people (43.2%) since the 2018 census, and an increase of 81 people (103.8%) since the 2013 census. There were 84 males and 75 females in 90 dwellings. The median age was 64.2 years (compared with 38.1 years nationally). There were 9 people (5.7%) aged under 15 years, 0 (0.0%) aged 15 to 29, 75 (47.2%) aged 30 to 64, and 75 (47.2%) aged 65 or older.

People could identify as more than one ethnicity. The results were 94.3% European (Pākehā), 13.2% Māori, and 1.9% Pasifika. English was spoken by 100.0%, Māori by 1.9%, and other languages by 3.8%. New Zealand Sign Language was known by 1.9%. The percentage of people born overseas was 13.2, compared with 28.8% nationally.

Religious affiliations were 37.7% Christian, and 1.9% other religions. People who answered that they had no religion were 54.7%, and 9.4% of people did not answer the census question.

Of those at least 15 years old, 24 (16.0%) people had a bachelor's or higher degree, 102 (68.0%) had a post-high school certificate or diploma, and 27 (18.0%) people exclusively held high school qualifications. The median income was $39,100, compared with $41,500 nationally. 21 people (14.0%) earned over $100,000 compared to 12.1% nationally. The employment status of those at least 15 was 45 (30.0%) full-time, 33 (22.0%) part-time, and 3 (2.0%) unemployed.
