= American Journal of Men's Health =

Academic journal

- Discipline: Health Sciences
- Language: English
- Edited by: Demetrius James Porche

Publication details
- History: 2007–present
- Publisher: SAGE Publications (United Kingdom)
- Frequency: Quarterly
- Impact factor: 1.234 (2014)

Standard abbreviations
- ISO 4: Am. J. Men's Health

Indexing
- ISSN: 1557-9883 (print); 1557-9891 (web)
- LCCN: 2005213793
- OCLC no.: 61494543

Links
- Journal homepage; Online access; Online archive

American Journal of Men's Health, is a peer-reviewed academic journal that publishes papers in the field of Health. The journal's editor is Demetrius James Porche (Louisiana State University Health Sciences Center New Orleans - School of Nursing). It has been in publication since 2007 and is currently published by SAGE Publications.

== Scope ==
American Journal of Men's Health (AJMH) publishes papers from a range of health, behavioral and social disciplines including medicine, nursing and allied health. The journal provides a forum for the discussion and dissemination of the latest findings and research in the field of men's health and illness.

== Abstracting and indexing ==
American Journal of Men's Health is abstracted and indexed in, among other databases: SCOPUS, and the Social Sciences Citation Index. According to the Journal Citation Reports, its 2014 impact factor is 1.234, ranking it 89 out of 145 journals in the category ‘Public, Environmental & Occupational Health’.
