= Felicity Goodyear-Smith =

New Zealand medical doctor, academic and public health advocate

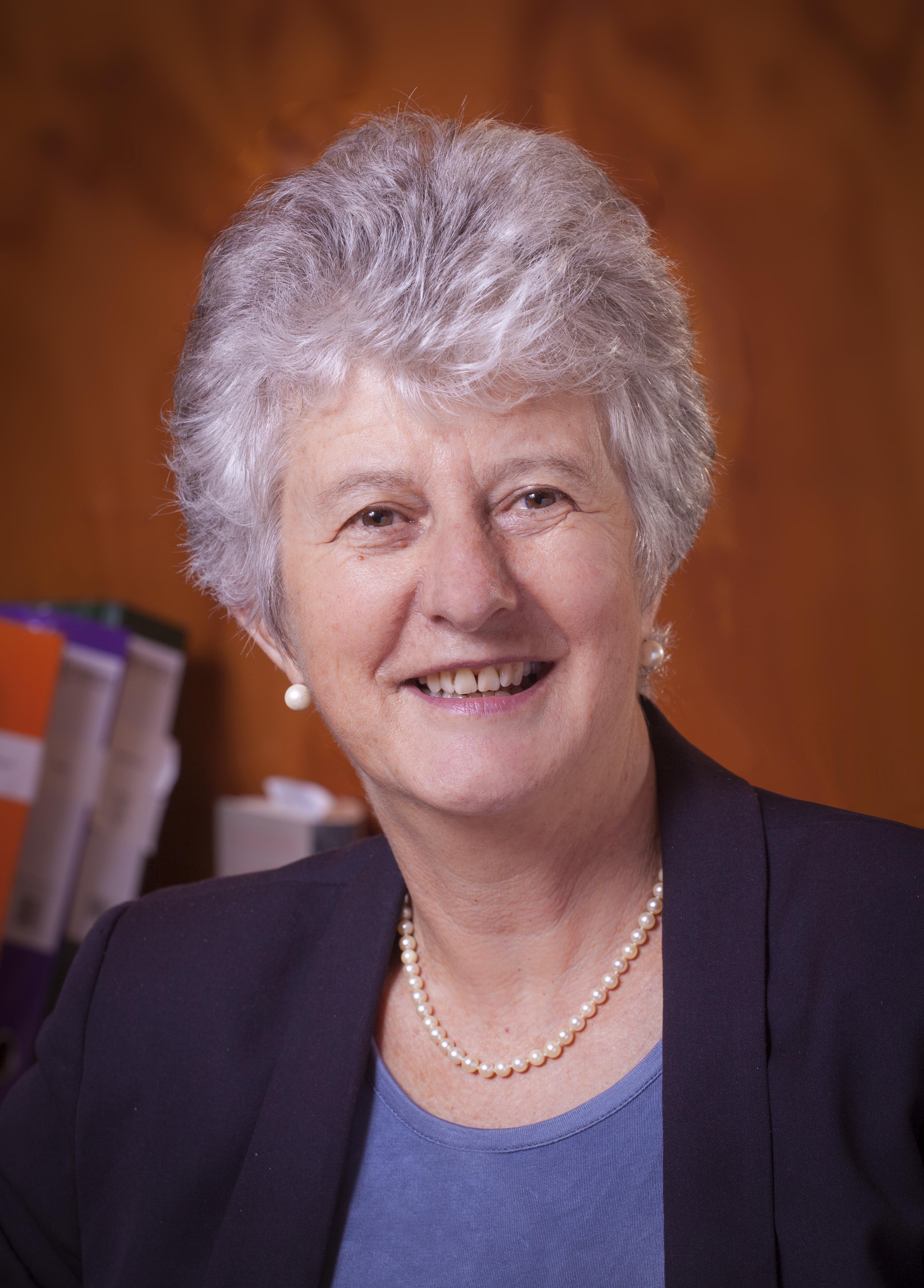
- Born: 1952 (age 73–74); Auckland, New Zealand
- Education: BSc (University of Auckland, 1973) MB CHB (University of Auckland, 1976) DipObst (University of Auckland, 1983) MGP (University of Otago, 1998) MD (University of Auckland, 2012)
- Occupations: Academic Head of Department & Goodfellow Postgraduate Chair, General Practice & Primary Health Care, Faculty of Medical and Health Science University of Auckland
- Scientific career
- Thesis: Evolution of the eCHAT: Case-finding to improve health and happiness (2011)
- Doctoral advisor: Bruce Arroll, Sunny Collings
- Website: http://goodyearsmith.com/

Felicity Anne Goodyear-Smith (born 1952) is a medical doctor, academic, and public health advocate from New Zealand. She is Academic Head of Department & Goodfellow Postgraduate Chair of General Practice & Primary Health Care in the Faculty of Medical and Health Science at the University of Auckland, New Zealand.

== Academic qualifications ==
Goodyear-Smith obtained a Diploma in Obstetrics in 1983 from the University of Auckland, New Zealand. In 1987 she obtained Vocational Registration as a General Practitioner with the Medical Council of New Zealand and became a Member of the Royal New Zealand College of General Practitioners (MRNZCGP) in 1992. She did her doctorate at the University of Auckland, supervised by Bruce Arroll and Sunny Collings, and wrote a 2011 doctoral thesis titled Evolution of the eCHAT: Case-finding to improve health and happiness.

In 2008, she became a member of the Royal Society of New Zealand (MRSNZ). In 2014, she became a fellow of the Faculty of Forensic & Legal Medicine (MFFLM) as well as the Royal College of Physicians (RCP). She became a distinguished fellow at the Royal New Zealand College of General Practitioners (FRNZCGP) in 2016. The award was granted to her for her services in fostering and contributing to research and academic teaching in general practice.

[Goodyear-Smith] "has inspired undergraduate general practice teaching, developed postgraduate primary health care programmes and remains a critic and conscience of primary health care."

— The Royal New Zealand College of General Practitioners, Winners of 2016 award ceremony.

== Clinical appointments ==
In 1978, Goodyear-Smith was Ship's Surgeon to the 'Marco Polo' of Dominion Far East Line.

In 1979, Goodyear-Smith travelled to Jamaica and held positions as Junior Registrar in Obstetrics & Gynaecology, Victoria Lying-In Hospital, Kingston; Medical Officer, Family Planning Clinics and Venereology Clinics, Kingston; Medical Officer, Red Hill Health Centre and Police Medical Officer, Kingston, Jamaica from 1979 to 1981.

After attaining her qualification as a general practitioner, and starting a relationship with John Potter, son of Centrepoint leader Bert Potter, she and John moved in to the commune next to Bert's residence. She began serving as the community's resident GP from 1989 onwards. After news of the community's systemic levels of sexual abuse broke in 1991 - John and Bert both being convicted on charges of child abuse - Goodyear-Smith became a vocal defender of the commune and its practices.

She also held concurrent positions as Assessment Visitor, Royal New Zealand College of General Practitioners 1998 to 2006; Locum Medical Officer, Auckland prisons 1990 to 2007; forensic physician with particular expertise in sexual assault cases 1979 to 2012; acted as a General Practice locum at Browns Bay Medical Centre and Calder Centre of the Auckland City Mission 1995 to 2012 and Certifying Consultant, Auckland Medical Aid Centre since 1983.

== Academic appointments ==
Goodyear-Smith was the founding Editor in Chief of the Journal of Primary Health Care from 2009.

Goodyear-Smith is Academic Head of Department, General Practice & Primary Health Care at the Faculty of Medical and Health Science University of Auckland.

== Career ==
=== Termination of pregnancy ===
Goodyear-Smith has worked as a certifying consultant under New Zealand's abortion act since 1981 and has published papers on related topics such as termination of pregnancy and contraception.

=== Medical aspects of sexual abuse ===
Goodyear-Smith has published a number of papers around the medical aspects of incidents of sexual abuse and in 1987 she co-authored a guide for general practitioners undertaking sexual assault examinations, Sexual assault examinations – a guide for medical practitioners, the first NZ text on medical examinations in this field.

In 2006 Goodyear-Smith was asked to review an alleged sexual abuse case involving gonorrhea in an infant. This led to a review of the literature revealing both sexual and non-sexual possible means of transmission of gonorrhea in children. This review was contested by some practitioners.

Goodyear-Smith was the medical adviser to the defence at the trial of George Gwaze who was twice charged and acquitted for the rape and murder of his ten year old niece. In 2015 she published a book about the trial and medical and forensic issues involved titled Murder that wasn't – the case of George Gwaze. "The Gwaze family's story illustrates how a fixed mindset can emerge at the outset of an investigation and be perpetuated every step along the way. The hope is that understanding how mistakes were made in this case can serve as lessons for the future."

=== False allegations of sexual abuse and recovered memories ===
During the 1990s Goodyear-Smith actively discussed and published concerning issues with the recovered memory movement in New Zealand. Her Masters thesis in General Practice at the University of Otago in 1997 was also concerned with this topic.

In 1994 Goodyear-Smith published a book titled First Do No Harm: the Sexual Abuse Industry which looked at then current research internationally in the field of sexual abuse and challenged prevailing opinions on suggestibility in this area. Reaction to the book was divided, with responses from both the clinical and political fields.

Goodyear-Smith was one of a number of professionals and others who formed Casualties Of Sexual Abuse in 1994 in response to what they believed were "the increasing number of false allegations of sexual abuse being made in New Zealand, which follow trends established in other countries." The national organisation closed in 1999, the Auckland branch in 2000.

=== Domestic violence and gender politics ===
In 1999 Goodyear-Smith jointly published a paper with TM Laidlaw researching gender imbalances in services provided to victims of domestic abuse. Goodyear-Smith has since researched and promoted support for male victims of domestic abuse and men's health in general.

In 2001 the New Zealand Ministry for Health issued a Family Violence Assessment and Intervention Guideline which proposed all female patients over 16 be routinely examined for sexual abuse. On the basis of a review of the evidence for this screening using international criteria Goodyear-Smith disagreed with the proposal and published several papers on the matter.

=== Genetically modified foods ===
In 2000 Goodyear-Smith was commissioned by an organisation (unnamed) to conduct a review into the health and safety of genetically modified foods for submission to the Royal Commission on Genetic Modification in New Zealand. Her paper was not used by the commissioning organisation but the research and conclusions was published in a journal article and several book articles. The journal article stated "GM foods may be as safe as conventional foods but public distrust runs high. It is important that discussion is informed by science and that claims of both benefits and risks are evidence-based, to ensure that the process is driven neither by the vested interest of the bio-technical multinational companies on the one hand, nor ill-informed public fears on the other."(p. 371)

=== Work for the Accident Compensation Corporation (ACC):1999–2007 ===
Goodyear-Smith was commissioned by the New Zealand Accident Compensation Corporation (ACC) to conduct a number of research projects between 1999 and 2007. This research ranged across topics such as arthroscopic knee surgery, management and referral of low back pain, management of carpal tunnel syndrome, effectiveness of corticosteroid injections, efficacy of anticonvulsant drugs for neuropathic pain management and sexual abuse counseling treatment rates by psychiatrists, psychologists and counselors under ACC funding. In 2009 some changes were made to the ACC sexual abuse clinical pathway which caused some contention in the counseling community, many of whom believed Goodyear-Smith had influenced these changes. Goodyear-Smith disputed any influence on the ACC clinical pathway.

=== Mandatory reporting ===
In 2011 the New Zealand Government released a discussion document requesting submissions suggesting policy changes and delivery of services to improve outcomes for vulnerable children including possible mandatory reporting of child abuse. Goodyear-Smith disagreed with the proposal for mandatory reporting and published several articles around this debate.

=== eCHAT and YouthCHAT ===
Since 2002 Goodyear-Smith has been involved in developing and implementing an electronic Case-finding and Help Assessment Tool (eCHAT) for use by general practitioners and also a version tailored to youth - YouthCHAT. The program has been implemented in a number of general practice clinics in New Zealand and research is being undertaken in Canada, Hong Kong and Australia to utilise the program in these countries.

=== Primary care research and locum work ===
Goodyear-Smith is keen to encourage more medical graduates to work in general practice. Goodyear-Smith suggests that fifty percent of medical graduates should become general practitioners to satisfy the primary care needs in New Zealand.

International Perspectives on Primary Care Research, released in April 2016, was jointly edited by Goodyear-Smith and Bob Mash with contributions from researchers in 20 countries that form part of the World Organization of Family Doctors (WONCA). Goodyear-Smith was appointed chair of the WONCA Working Party on Research in November 2016 and she also holds the chair of the North American Primary Care Research Group (NAPCRG) International Committee which supports primary care research and education globally.

Goodyear-Smith believes that her work with "underserved populations" has "taken [her] to some very interesting places" as part of her general practice. In 2016 Goodyear-Smith gave the Oration at RNZCGP Fellowship Ceremony which describes career in general practice.

== Personal life ==
Goodyear-Smith is married to John Potter, son of Bert Potter who was the founder of Centrepoint Community in the 1970s. Bert, John and five other members of the community were convicted of sexual abuse and served sentences.
