= International Journal of Qualitative Studies on Health and Well-being =

- Discipline: Qualitative research
- Language: English
- Edited by: Henrika Jormfeldt

Publication details
- History: 2006–present
- Publisher: Taylor & Francis
- Frequency: Quarterly
- Impact factor: 1.094 (2017)

Standard abbreviations
- ISO 4: Int. J. Qual. Stud. Health Well-being

Indexing
- ISSN: 1748-2623 (print); 1748-2631 (web)
- LCCN: 2006205938
- OCLC no.: 967841860

Links
- Journal homepage; Online access; Online archive

The International Journal of Qualitative Studies on Health and Well-being is a quarterly peer-reviewed open access scientific journal covering the application of qualitative research to the study of health. It was established in 2006 and is published by Taylor & Francis. The editor-in-chief is Henrika Jormfeldt (Halmstad University). According to the Journal Citation Reports, the journal has a 2017 impact factor of 1.094, ranking it 114th out of 156 journals in the category "Public, Environmental & Occupational Health".
