= Suzanne Barker-Collo =

New Zealand neuropsychology academic

Suzanne Lyn Barker-Collo
- Education: Lakehead University
- Scientific career
- Fields: Neuropsychology
- Workplaces: University of Auckland
- Thesis: A Model of Posttraumatic Stress Reactions to Sexual Abuse in Females (1997)

Suzanne Lyn Barker-Collo is a New Zealand neuropsychology academic, and as of 2019 is a full professor at the University of Auckland.

== Academic career ==
After a 1997 PhD titled A Model of Posttraumatic Stress Reactions to Sexual Abuse in Females at Lakehead University in Canada, Barker-Collo moved to the University of Auckland, rising to full professor.

Barker-Collo has been involved in a number of very-large scale systematic analyses based on the Global Burden of Disease Study.
