= Health Research Council of New Zealand =

New Zealand Crown entity

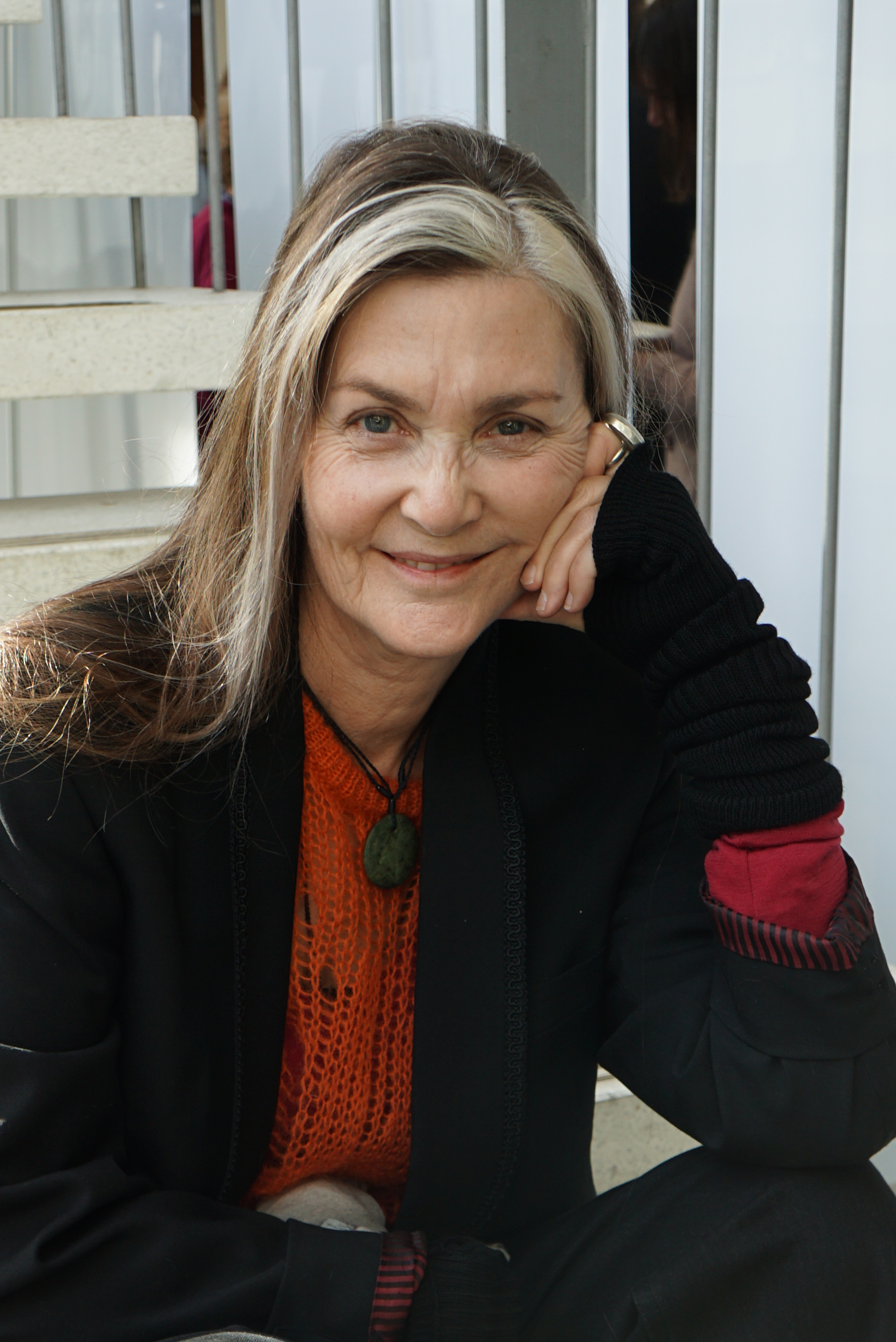
- Sunny Collings, Chief Executive of the HRC from 2020 to 2025
- Formation: 1990
- Headquarters: Wellington
- Chief Executive: Sunny Collings

The Health Research Council of New Zealand (HRC) is a Crown agency of the New Zealand Government. It is responsible for managing the government's investment in health research for the public good. The HRC was established under the Health Research Council Act 1990.

== Leadership ==
Since January 2016, HRC's board has been chaired by Dr Lester Levy. The council's Chief Executive since February 2020 is Professor Sunny Collings. In July 2025 the council announced that they would be seeking a new CEO after Collings was appointed to lead the Health Quality and Safety Commission.

== Activities ==
The statutory functions of the HRC include:

- administering funds in relation to national health research policy
- advising the Minister of Health
- supporting health research and those engaged in health research in New Zealand
- undertaking consultation to establish priorities in health research
- promoting and disseminating the results of health research.

The Council awards the Liley Medal annually for recent research which has made an outstanding contribution to the health and medical sciences. The council also awards the Beaven Medal annually for excellence in translational health research. The HRC also awards the Te Tohu Rapuora Medal for demonstrated leadership, excellence, and contribution to advancing Māori health and/or knowledge.

Before the establishment of the HRC, medical research in New Zealand was mostly overseen by the Medical Research Council of New Zealand (MRCNZ; 1937–1990). Jim Hodge was the director of the MRCNZ from 1972 to 1991.
