= Christine Thomson =

New Zealand nutritionist and academic

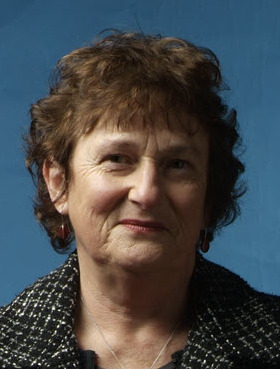

Academic background
- Education: University of Otago
- Thesis: The metabolism and nutritional importance of selenium in the human population of New Zealand (1973)

Academic work
- Institutions: University of Otago
- Doctoral students: Sheila Skeaff

Christine Dumont Thomson is a New Zealand nutritionist and academic, and is professor emerita at the University of Otago. Before her retirement in 2010 she researched iodine and selenium dietary deficiencies.

== Academic career ==
Thomson completed a Bachelor and Master of Health Science and a PhD at the University of Otago. Her doctoral dissertation was on the importance of selenium in the diet. Thomson joined the faculty of the university in 1976, rising to full professor in 2006.

Thomson's research focused on iodine and selenium in the diet, but she also had an interest in sports nutrition. Her interest in iodine continued a tradition of research into nutritional deficiencies at Otago, started by Charles Hercus, Noel Benson, Charles L. Carter and Muriel Bell, who showed in the 1920s that iodine deficiency in New Zealand soils was causing goitre. Iodised salt became available in New Zealand in 1939, but Thomson's research in the 1990s showed that iodine deficiency was once again a problem in New Zealand. A 2002 survey of schoolchildren by colleague Sheila Skeaff showed mild iodine deficiency, and the 2008–2009 National Nutrition Survey found similar in adults. The food standards were then altered so that it became mandatory to use iodised salt in bread, and subsequent surveys have shown a decline in iodine deficiency. Thomson also researched selenium deficiency, showing that eating one brazil nut per day was sufficient to raise most New Zealander's selenium to recommended levels.

Thomson was on the editorial advisory board for the New Zealand healthy food guide.

Thomson is retired from teaching and research, and was appointed professor emerita at Otago in 2010.

== Selected works ==
- A. M. van Rij; C. D. Thomson; J. M. McKenzie; M. F. Robinson (1979). "Selenium deficiency in total parenteral nutrition" (PDF). The American Journal of Clinical Nutrition. 32 (10): 2076–2085. doi:10.1093/ajcn/32.10.2076. PMID 114045. Wikidata Q39686639.
- Thomson, Christine Dumont; Harrison, Marion Frances (1980). "Selenium in human health and disease with emphasis on those aspects peculiar to New Zealand". The American Journal of Clinical Nutrition. 33 (2): 303–323. doi:10.1093/ajcn/33.2.303. PMID 6766657. Wikidata Q40256819.
- Thomson, Christine Dumont; Harrison, Marion Frances; J A Butler; P D Whanger (1993). "Long-term supplementation with selenate and selenomethionine: selenium and glutathione peroxidase (EC 1.11.1.9) in blood components of New Zealand women". British Journal of Nutrition. 69 (2): 577–588. doi:10.1079/bjn19930057. PMID 8490010. Wikidata Q70708099.
- Miller, Jody Carolyn; Sue O MacDonell; Gray, Andrew; Reid, Malcolm R.; David J Barr; Thomson, Christine Dumont; Houghton, Lisa Anne (2016). "Iodine Status of New Zealand Elderly Residents in Long-Term Residential Care". Nutrients. 8 (8). doi:10.3390/nu8080445. PMC 4997360. PMID 27455319. Wikidata Q37202591.
- Houghton, Lisa Anne; Parnell, Winsome Ruth; Thomson, Christine Dumont; Green, Timothy James; Gibson, Rosalind Susan (2016). "Serum Zinc Is a Major Predictor of Anemia and Mediates the Effect of Selenium on Hemoglobin in School-Aged Children in a Nationally Representative Survey in New Zealand". Journal of Nutrition. 146 (9): 1670–1676. doi:10.3945/jn.116.235127. PMID 27466609. Wikidata Q47730247.
- Kavitha C Menon; Ferguson, Elaine; Thomson, Christine Dumont; et al. (2014). "Iron status of pregnant Indian women from an area of active iron supplementation". Nutrition. 30 (3): 291–296. doi:10.1016/j.nut.2013.08.015. PMID 24484679. Wikidata Q39245221.
- Miller, Jody Carolyn; Thomson, Christine Dumont; Williams, Sheila M.; Nathalie van Havre; Gerard T Wilkins; Morison, Ian M.; Jackie L Ludgate; Skeaff, Clark Murray (2012). "Influence of the glutathione peroxidase 1 Pro200Leu polymorphism on the response of glutathione peroxidase activity to selenium supplementation: a randomized controlled trial". The American Journal of Clinical Nutrition. 96 (4): 923–931. doi:10.3945/ajcn.112.043125. PMID 22952184. Wikidata Q95407846.
- C. D. Thomson; Wickens, Kristin; Miller, Jody Carolyn; et al. (2012). "Selenium status and allergic disease in a cohort of New Zealand children". Clinical & Experimental Allergy. 42 (4): 560–567. doi:10.1111/j.1365-2222.2011.03924.x. PMID 22417214. Wikidata Q83644152.
- Sheila A. Skeaff; Christine D. Thomson; Wilson, Noela; Winsome R. Parnell (2012). "A comprehensive assessment of urinary iodine concentration and thyroid hormones in New Zealand schoolchildren: a cross-sectional study". Nutrition Journal. 11: 31. doi:10.1186/1475-2891-11-31. PMC 3422176. PMID 22569210. Wikidata Q36173292.
