= Rozanne Kruger =

South African dietitian and nutrition researcher

Academic background
- Education: University of Pretoria, University of Pretoria, University of Pretoria, North-West University
- Theses: Feeding practices and nutritional status of children (aged 0 to 3 years) in two clinics in the Moretele district (1999); The determinants of overweight among 10–15 year old schoolchildren in the North-West Province (2003)

Academic work
- Institutions: Massey University - Albany Campus, Massey University
- Doctoral students: Kathryn Beck, Wendy O'Brien, Victoria Chinn, Cheryl S Gammon, Nikki Renall, Joanne Slater, Carlien van der Merwe

Rozanne Kruger is a South African academic and registered dietitian, and is a full professor at Griffith University, specialising in developing new dietary assessment strategies, to examine patterns of dietary intake and behaviour, and training dietitians.

== Academic career ==
Kruger has a Master of Dietetics degree from the University of Pretoria in 1999. Kruger completed a PhD titled The determinants of overweight among 10–15 year old schoolchildren in the North-West Province at North-West University. Kruger then joined the faculty of the University of Pretoria, where she was Head of Food and Nutrition. Kruger was then appointed at Massey University, rising to full professor in 2022. At Massey University, Kruger was the discipline leader for the nutrition and dietetics Master of Science programme, which she was "instrumental" in developing and establishing. Kruger serves on the Council of Deans of Nutrition and Dietetics Australia and New Zealand. As of 2024, she was recently appointed as professor of at Griffith University in Australia, where she is the nutrition and dietetics lead in the School of Health Science and Social Work. Kruger retains an honorary position at Massey.

Kruger's research includes investigating patterns of dietary intake and behaviour, developing assessment strategies, and running clinical nutrition studies. Kruger uses trans-disciplinary, cross-sectional and intervention studies in her research. She is interested in metabolic health, physical activity, and body composition, as well as how clinical dietetics can contribute to disease treatment and improve patient outcomes.

== Selected works ==
- Kruger, Rozanne; Kruger HS; Macintyre UE (2006). "The determinants of overweight and obesity among 10- to 15-year-old schoolchildren in the North West Province, South Africa - the THUSA BANA (Transition and Health during Urbanisation of South Africans; BANA, children) study". Public Health Nutrition. 9 (3): 351–358. doi:10.1079/phn2006849. PMID 16684387. Wikidata Q39754469.
- Kruger, Rozanne; Gericke GJ (2003). "A qualitative exploration of rural feeding and weaning practices, knowledge and attitudes on nutrition". Public Health Nutrition. 6 (2): 217–223. doi:10.1079/phn2002419. PMID 12675965. Wikidata Q47993654.
- Ware, Lisa; Rennie, Kirsten; H S Kruger; et al. (2014). "Evaluation of waist-to-height ratio to predict 5 year cardiometabolic risk in sub-Saharan African adults". Nutrition, Metabolism, and Cardiovascular Diseases. 24 (8): 900–907. doi:10.1016/j.numecd.2014.02.005. PMID 24675009. Wikidata Q39221433.
- Beck, Kathryn Louise; Conlon, Cathryn Anne; Kruger, Rozanne; Coad, Jane (2014). "Dietary determinants of and possible solutions to iron deficiency for young women living in industrialized countries: a review". Nutrients. 6 (9): 3747–3776. doi:10.3390/nu6093747. PMC 4179187. PMID 25244367. Wikidata Q34263556.
- Oldewage-Theron, Wilna; Kruger, Rozanne (2008). "Food variety and dietary diversity as indicators of the dietary adequacy and health status of an elderly population in Sharpeville, South Africa". Journal of Nutrition in Gerontology and Geriatrics. 27 (1–2): 101–133. doi:10.1080/01639360802060140. PMID 18928193. Wikidata Q45974327.
- Oldewage-Theron, Wilna; Kruger, Rozanne (2010). "Dietary diversity and adequacy of women caregivers in a peri-urban informal settlement in South Africa". Nutrition. 27 (4): 420–427. doi:10.1016/j.nut.2010.05.013. PMID 20688475. Wikidata Q39944644.
- Gammon, Cheryl; Hurst, Pamela Ruth; Coad, Jane; Kruger, Rozanne; Oosthuizen, Welma (2011). "Vegetarianism, vitamin B12 status, and insulin resistance in a group of predominantly overweight/obese South Asian women". Nutrition. 28 (1): 20–24. doi:10.1016/j.nut.2011.05.006. PMID 21835592. Wikidata Q84748716.
- Beck, Kathryn Louise; Kruger, Rozanne; Conlon, Cathryn Anne; Heath, Anne-Louise Mary; Coad, Jane; Matthys, Christophe; Jones, Beatrix; Oosthuizen, Welma (2012). "The relative validity and reproducibility of an iron food frequency questionnaire for identifying iron-related dietary patterns in young women". Journal of the Academy of Nutrition and Dietetics. 112 (8): 1177–1187. doi:10.1016/j.jand.2012.05.012. PMID 22818726. Wikidata Q47360207.
