= Lisa Houghton =

New Zealand nutritional scientist

- Other name: Lisa Anne Houghton
- Education: University of Guelph
- Alma mater: University of Toronto
- Known for: Community and international nutrition
- Scientific career
- Fields: Human nutrition
- Workplaces: Acadia University; University of Otago
- Thesis: The effect of folate supplementation on folate status and breastmilk folate concentration in lactating women (2007)

Lisa Anne Houghton is a New Zealand-based scientist, professor and head of the Department of Human Nutrition at the University of Otago.

== Academic career ==
Houghton graduated from the University of Guelph, Ontario, Canada with a MSc (1996) for her thesis titled "The Influence of Dietary Fiber on the Folate Status of a Group of Adolescent Females". Following graduation, she worked at Acadia University as assistant professor, at The Hospital for Sick Children in Toronto before moving to the United States to work at Abbott Laboratories in the Premature Infant Nutrition division.

She completed a PhD (2007) in nutritional sciences at the University of Toronto. Her thesis was "The effect of folate supplementation on folate status and breastmilk folate concentration in lactating women".

Houghton moved to New Zealand in 2008 to take up a lecturing role at the University of Otago. She was promoted to associate professor in November 2015. In December 2019 she, along with two of her colleagues Rachel Brown and Caroline Horwath, was promoted to full professor with effect from 1 February 2020. She combines her academic role with that of director of the World Health Organization Collaborating Centre in Human Nutrition.

== Selected works ==
- Maria Choukri; Tamlin S Conner; Jill J Haszard; Michelle J Harper; Lisa Houghton (23 August 2018). "Effect of vitamin D supplementation on depressive symptoms and psychological wellbeing in healthy adult women: a double-blind randomised controlled clinical trial". Journal of Nutritional Science. 7 e23. doi:10.1017/JNS.2018.14. ISSN 2048-6790. PMC 6123885. PMID 30197783.
- Lisa Houghton; Rachel Brown; Sarah Beaumont; et al. (11 April 2019). "Micronutrient status differs among Maasai and Kamba preschoolers in a supplementary feeding programme in Kenya". Maternal Child Nutrition. 15 (3) e12805. doi:10.1111/MCN.12805. ISSN 1740-8695. PMC 7198922. PMID 30822819.
- Aly Diana; Jillian J Haszard; Lisa Houghton; Rosalind S Gibson (24 June 2019). "Breastmilk intake among exclusively breastfed Indonesian infants is negatively associated with maternal fat mass". European Journal of Clinical Nutrition. 73 (8): 1206–1208. doi:10.1038/S41430-019-0458-1. ISSN 0954-3007. PMC 6760621. PMID 31235956.
- Lisa Houghton; Deborah R McIntosh; Geeta Trilok-Kumar; Jillian J Haszard; Rosalind S Gibson (16 July 2019). "Suboptimal feeding and caring practices among young Indian children ages 12 to 24 mo living in the slums of New Delhi". Nutrition. 69 110553. doi:10.1016/J.NUT.2019.110553. ISSN 0899-9007. PMID 31539814.
- Blair Lawley; Anna Otal; Kit Moloney-Geany; Aly Diana; Lisa Houghton; Anne-Louise M Heath; Rachael W Taylor; Gerald W Tannock (17 September 2019). "Fecal Microbiotas of Indonesian and New Zealand Children Differ in Complexity and Bifidobacterial Taxa during the First Year of Life". Applied and Environmental Microbiology. 85 (19) e01105-19. Bibcode:2019ApEnM..85E1105L. doi:10.1128/AEM.01105-19. ISSN 0099-2240. PMC 6752005. PMID 31375480.
