= Anne-Louise Heath =

New Zealand nutritionist

- Awards: Early Career Award for Distinction in Research

Academic background
- Education: University of Otago, University of Otago, University of Otago
- Theses: The association between dietary factors and serum concentrations of testosterone, dihydrotestosterone and 3-a-17-B-androstanediol glucuronide in healthy men (1994); Mild iron deficiency in premenopausal women from Dunedin, New Zealand (1999)

Anne-Louise M. Heath is a New Zealand academic, and is a full professor at the University of Otago, specialising in baby and infant nutrition, including baby-led weaning and iron deficiency.

== Academic career ==
Heath completed a Bachelor of Science degree with honours in 1994, with a thesis on hormone levels in healthy men. Heath then completed a PhD at the University of Otago, studying iron deficiency in pre-menopausal women. Heath then joined the faculty of the University of Otago, rising to associate professor in 2017 and full professor in 2023. She has served on two government Technical Advisory Groups, one for the Development of the New Zealand Nutrition Survey, and the other for the Review of Nutrition Guidance for Pregnant and Breastfeeding Women, and Infants and Toddlers.

Heath's research focuses on infant nutrition, covering issues such as the nutritional impact and safety of baby-led weaning. Heath and Professor Rachael Taylor collaborated on a study that showed that toddlers that had experienced baby-led weaning were less fussy eaters and enjoyed their food more. She has also studied iron deficiency in infants and adults. Heath has commented on the whether "toddler milk" is necessary, with her research finding that fortified milk and an increase in red meat are both ways of avoiding reduced iron levels in two-year olds, but that the meat diet was cheaper. Heath received a Health Research Council grant with Rachael Taylor to study the health impacts of baby food pouches. Pouches may make up 70% of baby-food availability in New Zealand supermarkets, and the study was aimed at addressing concerns about whether their use might encourage babies to overeat, and whether their use would affect nutritional intake and dental health. In 2011, Heath was part of a group of seven Otago researchers who presented their work at Parliament.

== Selected works ==
- Taylor, Rachael; Williams, Sheila M.; Fangupo, Louise Joan; Wheeler, Benjamin John; Taylor, Barry James; Daniels, Lisa; Fleming, Elizabeth Ann; McArthur, Jenny; Morison, Brittany Jane; Liz Williams Erickson; Rhondda S Davies; Sabina Bacchus; Sonya L Cameron; Anne-Louise M Heath (2017). "Effect of a Baby-Led Approach to Complementary Feeding on Infant Growth and Overweight: A Randomized Clinical Trial". JAMA Pediatrics. 171 (9): 838–846. doi:10.1001/jamapediatrics.2017.1284. PMC 5710413. PMID 28692728. Wikidata Q38374283.
- Cameron, Sonya Lynne; Heath, Anne-Louise Mary; Taylor, Rachael (2012). "How feasible is Baby-led Weaning as an approach to infant feeding? A review of the evidence". Nutrients. 4 (11): 1575–1609. doi:10.3390/nu4111575. PMC 3509508. PMID 23201835. Wikidata Q36432256.
- Daniels, Lisa; Heath, Anne-Louise Mary; Williams, Sheila M.; Cameron, Sonya Lynne; Fleming, Elizabeth Ann; Taylor, Barry James; Wheeler, Benjamin John; Gibson, Rosalind Susan; Taylor, Rachael (2015). "Baby-Led Introduction to SolidS (BLISS) study: a randomised controlled trial of a baby-led approach to complementary feeding". BMC Pediatrics. 15: 179. doi:10.1186/s12887-015-0491-8. PMC 4643507. PMID 26563757. Wikidata Q35840297.
- Gibson, Rosalind Susan; Heath, Anne-Louise Mary; Gay, Ewa Anna (2014). "Is iron and zinc nutrition a concern for vegetarian infants and young children in industrialized countries?". The American Journal of Clinical Nutrition. 100 Suppl 1 (suppl_1): 459S–68S. doi:10.3945/ajcn.113.071241. PMID 24871479. Wikidata Q62027244.
- Cameron, Sonya Lynne; Heath, Anne-Louise Mary; Taylor, Rachael (2012). "Healthcare professionals' and mothers' knowledge of, attitudes to and experiences with, Baby-Led Weaning: a content analysis study". BMJ Open. 2 (6). doi:10.1136/bmjopen-2012-001542. PMC 3532980. PMID 23183112. Wikidata Q30530807.
- Heath, Anne-Louise Mary; Skeaff, Clark Murray; Williams, Sheila M.; Gibson, Rosalind Susan (2001). "The role of blood loss and diet in the aetiology of mild iron deficiency in premenopausal adult New Zealand women". Public Health Nutrition. 4 (2): 197–206. doi:10.1079/phn200054. PMID 11299092. Wikidata Q73741943.
- Heath, Anne-Louise Mary; Susan J Fairweather-Tait (2002). "Clinical implications of changes in the modern diet: iron intake, absorption and status". Best Practice and Research: Clinical Haematology. 15 (2): 225–241. doi:10.1053/beha.2002.0208. PMID 12401305. Wikidata Q34980770.
