= Cath Conlon =

New Zealand nutritionist

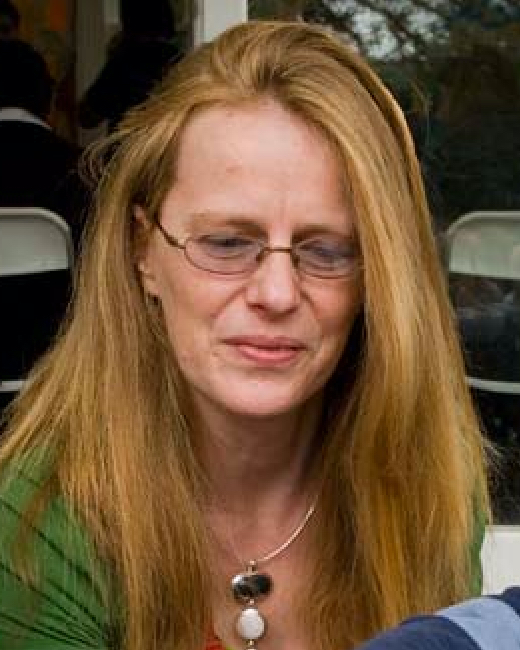
- Conlon in 2008
- Born: Cathryn Anne Conlon

Academic background
- Education: University of Sheffield
- Thesis: The efficacy of the antioxidants α-tocopherol and ascorbic acid in preventing lipid peroxidation of parenteral lipid emulsions administered to premature babies (2003)

Academic work
- Institutions: Massey University
- Doctoral students: Kathryn Beck

Cathryn Anne Conlon is a New Zealand academic, and is a full professor at Massey University, specialising in maternal and early-life nutrition.

== Academic career ==
Conlon completed a Bachelor of Science degree at the University of London, followed by a Master of Medical Science and a PhD at the University of Sheffield. She first worked as a paediatric nurse at Great Ormond Street Hospital before her interest in nutrition in babies led her to move into academia. Her PhD thesis, completed in 2003, was titled The efficacy of the antioxidants α-tocopherol and ascorbic acid in preventing lipid peroxidation of parenteral lipid emulsions administered to premature babies. Conlon then joined the faculty of Massey University, rising to full professor in 2023.

Conlon researches nutrition in pregnant women and in early life. Conlon's research has shown that less than a third of pregnant women in New Zealand were getting the recommended amount of omega-3 fatty acids in their diet. She also research how kiwifruit could improve iron intake in iron-deficient women, with student Kathryn Beck. She was an invited expert on the technical group advising the Ministry of Health on the maternal and infant dietary guidelines. Conlon also researches infant and toddler nutrition, researching topics such as baby-led weaning and how to increase the acceptance of vegetables. In 2017, Conlon featured in the TVNZ1 documentary The secret lives of fussy eaters, alongside colleagues Emily Jones, a speech and language therapist, and Reena Soniassy-Unkovich.

Conlon is an associate investigator at the Riddet Institute, a Centre of Research Excellence based at Massey.

As of 2024, Conlon is vice-president of the Nutrition Society of New Zealand.

== Selected works ==
- Oosthuizen, Welma; Cathryn A. Conlon; John Podd; Hill, Stephen Robert; Anne M. Minihane; Crystal Haskell; Kennedy, David (2013). "DHA supplementation improved both memory and reaction time in healthy young adults: a randomized controlled trial" (PDF). The American Journal of Clinical Nutrition. 97 (5): 1134–1143. doi:10.3945/ajcn.112.053371. PMID 23515006. Wikidata Q48117600.
- Coad, Jane; Conlon, Cathryn Anne (2011). "Iron deficiency in women: assessment, causes and consequences". Current Opinion in Clinical Nutrition and Metabolic Care. 14 (6): 625–634. doi:10.1097/mco.0b013e32834be6fd. PMID 21934611. Wikidata Q37936183.
- Beck, Kathryn Louise; Conlon, Cathryn Anne; Kruger, Rozanne; Coad, Jane (2014). "Dietary determinants of and possible solutions to iron deficiency for young women living in industrialized countries: a review". Nutrients. 6 (9): 3747–3776. doi:10.3390/nu6093747. PMC 4179187. PMID 25244367. Wikidata Q34263556.
- Hajar Mazahery; Carlos A. Camargo; Conlon, Cathryn Anne; Beck, Kathryn Louise; Kruger, Marlena C.; Hurst, Pamela Ruth (2016). "Vitamin D and Autism Spectrum Disorder: A Literature Review". Nutrients. 8 (4): 236. doi:10.3390/nu8040236. PMC 4848704. PMID 27110819. Wikidata Q26750537.
- Jamie de Seymour; Airu Chia; Marjorelee Colega; et al. (2016). "Maternal Dietary Patterns and Gestational Diabetes Mellitus in a Multi-Ethnic Asian Cohort: The GUSTO Study". Nutrients. 8 (9). doi:10.3390/nu8090574. PMC 5037559. PMID 27657116. Wikidata Q37285910.
