= Ranjit Chandra =

Indian-Canadian former doctor

- Born: Ranjit Kumar Chandra; February 2, 1938 (age 88); Mailsi, India
- Education: All India Institute of Medical Sciences; Panjab University; Khalsa College, Amritsar
- Known for: Scientific and health care fraud
- Medical career
- Field: Pediatrics
- Institutions: Memorial University
- Research: Nutritional immunology
- Awards: Officer of the Order of Canada (1989; revoked 2015); Queen Elizabeth II Golden Jubilee Medal (2002); Queen Elizabeth II Diamond Jubilee Medal (2012)

Ranjit Kumar Chandra (रंजीत कुमार चंद्रा; born February 2, 1938) is an Indian-born Canadian researcher and self-proclaimed "father of nutritional immunology" who committed scientific and health care fraud. Chandra's misconduct was the subject of a 2006 documentary by the Canadian Broadcasting Corporation (CBC). A libel trial in July 2015, concluded that the allegations of fraud against Chandra were truthful; he was ordered to pay $1.6 million to cover CBC's legal fees, and later that year was stripped of his membership in the Order of Canada. As of 2020, four of Chandra's research publications have been retracted, and one has been corrected.

In 2016, the Ontario Provincial Police issued a warrant for Chandra's arrest, based on a criminal charge of fraud exceeding $5,000 for having allegedly defrauded the Ontario Health Insurance Plan.

== Scientific fraud ==
In the late 1980s, Chandra was hired by Ross Laboratories, US manufacturer of Isomil and Similac, to determine if their infant formulas could help babies avoid allergy problems; Nestlé (Good Start) and Mead Johnson had also contracted with Chandra for similar studies on their infant formulas. Chandra reported that the Nestlé and Mead Johnson formulas could protect infants from allergies, but the Ross formula could not, despite nearly identical ingredients in the three studied formulas. Marilyn Harvey, a nurse who recruited subjects for Chandra's studies and who disputed the accuracy of the number of infants reportedly enrolled in those studies, stated, "[Chandra] had all of the data analyzed and published even before we had [...] the data collected." In explaining his suspicious results to Mark Masor, then clinical research associate for Ross Pharmaceuticals, Chandra allegedly stated that "the study really wasn't designed right," although he had designed the studies himself, and he also claimed "you didn't really pay me enough money to do it correctly."

In 1994, Memorial University, at which Chandra was a professor, investigated him for research fraud but its findings were kept private.

In 2001, a study by Chandra and published in the journal Nutrition claimed that his own, patented multivitamin mineral supplement — the rights to which had been licensed to Javaan Corporation, a company founded by his daughter Amrita Chandra Gagnon — could reverse memory problems in people over the age of 65. The same study had earlier been submitted to, and rejected by, the British Medical Journal (BMJ), following a review by an expert who reported that the study had "all the hallmarks of being entirely invented." In response to questions raised about the paper's validity, including questions of whether any of the reported work had actually been performed, Nutrition published an editorial that stated, "We regret that our peer review process failed to identify these problems before publication." Officials at Memorial University, where Chandra had been a faculty member and where the study was allegedly conducted, were requested to investigate but did not, stating that the combination of Chandra's retirement, his having left the country, and his claim that all the raw data had been lost during an office move prevented an investigation. In 2005 the paper was retracted.

In 2002, "Amrit L. Jain", allegedly a pseudonym of Chandra's, published a study in Nutrition Research that confirmed Chandra's earlier results on the effects of vitamin ingestion upon respiratory illness. Jain, who claimed affiliation with the non-existent Medical Clinic and Nursing Home, Jaipur, India, used as a mailing address a rented post office box in Canada. Attempts to verify Jain's identity or existence have been unsuccessful, and in 2016 the Jain paper was retracted.

Although Chandra retired from Memorial University of Newfoundland (MUN) under a cloud of suspicion, university officials did not charge him with research fraud. At least one university administrator admitted that Chandra's allegations of bias and threats of a lawsuit led to the termination of the university's investigation. Marilyn Harvey would later enter into legal proceedings against Memorial University, claiming that the lack of action by MUN against Chandra caused people to erroneously believe that her allegations against Chandra were unfounded. In response to the scandal, Memorial University later created the "Marilyn Harvey Award to Recognize the Importance of Research Ethics."

In 2015, Chandra filed a lawsuit against the CBC seeking damages for libel in relation to a news segment entitled "The Secret Life of Dr. Chandra," which detailed many of the allegations of scientific and medical fraud (see below) against Chandra. The Ontario Superior Court ruled that the CBC's defence, based upon fair comment and responsible journalism, were allowed to go to the jury. The jury found that the substance of the CBC broadcast was true, and dismissed Chandra's claim that in preparing the program the CBC had invaded his privacy. The court also ordered Chandra to pay $1.6 million to cover the CBC's legal fees. The presiding judge, Justice Graeme Mew, wrote in the opinion of the court: "Tactically, Dr. Chandra played a high stakes game. The phrase, 'live by the sword, die by the sword' comes to mind. In the end, he failed abjectly."

Chandra had been appointed in 1989 as an Officer in the Order of Canada. His membership in the Order of Canada was terminated on December 3, 2015.

== Investigation by College of Physicians and Surgeons of Ontario ==
Chandra is listed in the official directory of the College of Physicians and Surgeons of Ontario (CPSO) with a revocation of registration effective June 18, 2018. The Discipline Committee of the CPSO investigated allegations of fraud against Chandra, and found that he engaged in a multi-year scheme to defraud the Ontario Health Insurance Plan (OHIP) of over $2 million. College prosecutor Elisabeth Widner said, "[Chandra] targeted OHIP in a calculated fraud in which he used and induced patients and staff members by furnishing them with money and cheques for improper use in a billing scheme ... There was little to no medical services provided for the $2 million-plus..." The Committee report stated that Chandra's actions could be "reasonably [...] regarded by members as disgraceful, dishonourable or unprofessional." Along with revocation of Chandra's certificate of registration, the Committee ordered Chandra to pay over $51,000 in fines and College costs.

== See also ==
- List of scientific misconduct incidents
