= Tamlin Conner =

New Zealand-based psychologist

Academic background
- Education: University of Colorado, Boston College
- Thesis: Experience-sampling procedures are they probes to autonoetic awareness? (2003)
- Doctoral advisor: Lisa Feldman Barrett

Tamlin S. Conner is an American–New Zealand academic psychologist, and is a full professor at the University of Otago, specialising in researching the science of wellbeing and happiness.

== Academic career ==
Conner grew up in California, and completed a Bachelor of Arts at the University of Colorado in Boulder followed by a PhD in social psychology at Boston College, with a thesis titled Experience-sampling procedures are they probes to autonoetic awareness?. Her supervisor was Lisa Feldman Barrett. Conner then joined the faculty of the University of Otago in New Zealand, rising to associate professor in 2018 and full professor in 2023.

Conner researches normal behaviour, and ways to assess people's behaviour in their normal environments. She is an expert in ambulatory assessment, using smartphone survey techniques to measure daily life and natural behaviour. She works on subjective wellbeing, and has published on research that showed how to identify people more likely to vape, allowing targeting of health messaging, the effects of kiwifruit consumption, sleep, exercise and diet on mood and wellbeing. She co-edited the Handbook of Research Methods for Studying Daily Life, with Matthias Mehl, published in 2012 by Guilford Press.

As of 2024 Conner is a member of the Economics and Human and Behavioural Sciences panel for assessing Marsden grant proposals, and she is an associate editor for the journal Emotion. She is a past vice-president of the Society for Ambulatory Assessment.

== Honours and awards ==
Conner was awarded the Otago University Student Association Supervisor of the Year award in 2017. Boston College graduate student teaching excellence award. Nominee for OUSA award again in 2018.

== Selected works ==
- Feldman, Lisa; Gross, James; Conner, Tamlin S.; Michael Benvenuto (2001). "Knowing what you're feeling and knowing what to do about it: Mapping the relation between emotion differentiation and emotion regulation". Cognition and Emotion. 15 (6): 713–724. doi:10.1080/02699930143000239. Wikidata Q60736104.
- Conner, Tamlin S.; Feldman, Lisa; Bliss, Eliza; Kirsten Lebo; Conner, Tamlin S. (2003). "A Practical Guide to Experience-Sampling Procedures". Journal of Happiness Studies. 4 (1): 53–78. doi:10.1023/a:1023609306024. Wikidata Q60736100.
- Conner, Tamlin S.; Howard Tennen; Fleeson, William; Feldman, Lisa (2009). "Experience Sampling Methods: A Modern Idiographic Approach to Personality Research". Social and Personality Psychology Compass. 3 (3): 292–313. doi:10.1111/j.1751-9004.2009.00170.x. PMC 2773515. PMID 19898679. Wikidata Q37412418.
- Conner, Tamlin S.; Colin G. DeYoung; Paul J. Silvia (2016). "Everyday creative activity as a path to flourishing". The Journal of Positive Psychology. 13 (2): 181–189. doi:10.1080/17439760.2016.1257049. Wikidata Q60736019.
- Conner, Tamlin S.; Feldman, Lisa (2012). "Trends in ambulatory self-report: the role of momentary experience in psychosomatic medicine". Psychosomatic Medicine. 74 (4): 327–337. doi:10.1097/psy.0b013e3182546f18. PMC 3372543. PMID 22582330. Wikidata Q36024073.
- Bonnie A White; Horwath, Caroline; Conner, Tamlin S. (2013). "Many apples a day keep the blues away--daily experiences of negative and positive affect and food consumption in young adults". British Journal of Health Psychology. 18 (4): 782–798. doi:10.1111/bjhp.12021. PMID 23347122. Wikidata Q34324171.
