= Colleen Higgins =

New Zealand plant pathologist

Academic background
- Education: University of Queensland, University College London
- Thesis: HLA-B27 and related genes in the aetiopathogenesis of ankylosing spondylitis (1990)

Colleen Michele Higgins is a New Zealand academic plant pathologist, and is a full professor at the Auckland University of Technology, specialising in plant viruses and environmental microbiology. Higgins won an award for her teaching in 2013, for a course she developed on ethics and emerging health and biological technologies.

== Academic career ==
Higgins completed a Bachelor of Science with Honours in plant molecular pathology at the University of Queensland and a PhD titled HLA-B27 and related genes in the aetiopathogenesis of ankylosing spondylitis at University College London. Higgins returned to studying plants, and undertook postdoctoral research on viral evolution and genetically modified crops at CSIRO, the University of Queensland and Queensland University of Technology. She was also a senior scientist working on Botrytis cinerea at a New Zealand biotechnology company. Higgins then joined the faculty of the School of Applied Sciences at Auckland University of Technology in 2004, rising to full professor in 2024. Higgins developed a postgraduate paper on ethics and emerging health and biological technologies. In 2013, Higgins was awarded an Academic Excellence in Teaching Award by AUT. She has served as vice-president of the Australasian Plant Pathology Society.

Higgins's research covers diagnosis of plant viruses, viral diversity and evolution, and interactions between viruses and host plants. She uses molecular biology techniques to study the susceptibility of plants to viruses in crop plants and native New Zealand plants. She also studies bacterial genomics and taxonomy.

== Selected works ==
- Gaya K. Amarasinghe; Yīmíng Bào; Basler, Christopher; et al. (2017). "Taxonomy of the order Mononegavirales: update 2017". Archives of Virology. 162 (8): 2493–2504. doi:10.1007/s00705-017-3311-7. PMC 5831667. PMID 28389807. Wikidata Q34554971.
- Gardette R Valmonte; Kieren Arthur; Higgins, Colleen Michele; MacDiarmid, Robin Marion (2013). "Calcium-dependent protein kinases in plants: evolution, expression and function". Plant and Cell Physiology. 55 (3): 551–569. doi:10.1093/pcp/pct200. PMID 24363288. Wikidata Q46956211.
- Reema Jain; Hurst, Pamela Ruth; Oosthuizen, Welma; Love, Donald Roy; Higgins, Colleen Michele; Coad, Jane (2011). "Association of vitamin D receptor gene polymorphisms with insulin resistance and response to vitamin D.". Metabolism. 61 (3): 293–301. doi:10.1016/j.metabol.2011.06.018. PMID 21871642. Wikidata Q54352004.
- L M Tabe; Higgins, Colleen Michele; McNabb, Warren Charles; T J Higgins (1993). "Genetic engineering of grain and pasture legumes for improved nutritive value". Genetica. 90 (2–3): 181–200. doi:10.1007/bf01435039. PMID 8119592. Wikidata Q40720576.
- Sean T S Wei; Lacap, Donnabella C.; Maggie C.Y. Lau Vetter; et al. (2016). "Taxonomic and Functional Diversity of Soil and Hypolithic Microbial Communities in Miers Valley, McMurdo Dry Valleys, Antarctica". Frontiers in Microbiology. 7: 1642. doi:10.3389/fmicb.2016.01642. PMC 5071352. PMID 27812351. Wikidata Q37351955.
- Higgins, Colleen Michele; Rhonda M Hall; Neena Mitter; Alan Cruickshank; Ralf G Dietzgen (2004). "Peanut stripe potyvirus resistance in peanut (Arachis hypogaea L.) plants carrying viral coat protein gene sequences". Transgenic Research. 13 (1): 59–67. doi:10.1023/b:trag.0000017166.29458.74. PMID 15070076. Wikidata Q47802013.
- Higgins, Colleen Michele; Manners JM; Scott KJ (1985). "Decrease in Three Messenger RNA Species Coding for Chloroplast Proteins in Leaves of Barley Infected with Erysiphe graminis f. sp. hordei". Plant Physiology. 78 (4): 891–894. doi:10.1104/pp.78.4.891. PMID 16664347. Wikidata Q47930912.
