= Kathryn Beck (dietitian) =

New Zealand dietitian

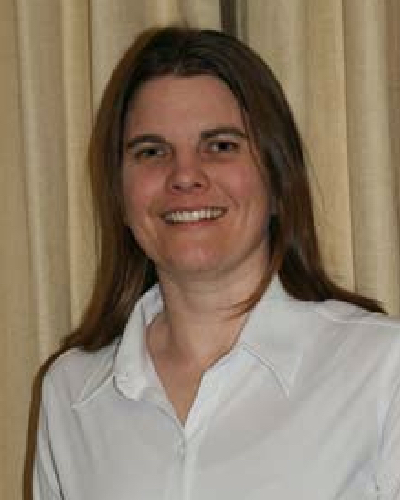
- Beck in 2008

Academic background
- Education: Massey University
- Theses: The effect of a meat extract on iron absorption in young women (2007); Iron deficiency in young women : causes, consequences and solutions (2013)
- Doctoral advisor: Welma Stonehouse, Jane Coad, Cath Conlon, Rozanne Kruger

Academic work
- Institutions: Massey University
- Doctoral students: Hajar Mazahery, Nicola Martin

Kathryn Louise Beck is a New Zealand academic, a registered dietitian, and is a full professor at Massey University, specialising in dietary assessment, sustainable nutrition, and iron deficiency in young women and sportspeople.

== Academic career ==
After completing Bachelor of Physical Education and Bachelor of Science degrees at the University of Otago, Beck moved to Massey University to undertake a Master's degree on the effect of meat extract on iron absorption. She continued her iron absorption research with a PhD titled Iron deficiency in young women: causes, consequences and solutions, completed in 2013. Beck then joined the faculty of the university, rising to full professor in 2024.

Beck has worked in clinical, community and academic settings. Beck's research covers dietary assessment, sustainable nutrition and especially iron deficiency. She is also interested on the health impacts of ultra-processed food, and iron status in sportspeople, for instance she has researched iron deficiency in adolescent ballet dancers. She has received more than $4 million of research funding, including grants from the Health Research Council and MBIE. She is a World Cancer Research Fund Academy Fellow. Research funding from the New Zealand Heart Foundation will be used to investigate the effect of ultra-processed food on heart health in children.

Beck is a registered dietitian, and leads the Master of Science in Nutrition and Dietetics at Massey. Beck is on the editorial boards of the Nutrition Journal and the Journal of Sport and Exercise Science.

== Honours and awards ==
In 2020 Beck was awarded the Massey University Early Career research award.

== Selected works ==
- Kathryn L. Beck; Jasmine S. Thomson; Richard J. Swift; Pamela R. von Hurst (2015). "Role of nutrition in performance enhancement and postexercise recovery". Open Access Journal of Sports Medicine. 6: 259-67, 259. doi:10.2147/oajsm.s33605. PMC 4540168. PMID 26316828. Wikidata Q26796400.
- Ziad El-Khatib; Hedt, Bethany L.; Christine Mutaganzwa; Kirk, Catherine; Beck, Kathryn Louise; Albert Ndayisaba; Joel Mubiligi; Fredrick Kateera; Ziad El-Khatib (2019). "Risk factors for stunting among children under five years: a cross-sectional population-based study in Rwanda using the 2015 Demographic and Health Survey". BMC Public Health. 19 (1): 175. doi:10.1186/s12889-019-6504-z. PMC 6371425. PMID 30744614. Wikidata Q63865680.
- Capling, Louise; Beck, Kathryn; Gifford, Janelle; Slater, Gary; Flood, Victoria; o'Connor, Helen (2017). "Validity of Dietary Assessment in Athletes: A Systematic Review". Nutrients. 9 (12): 1313. doi:10.3390/nu9121313. PMC 5748763. PMID 29207495.
- Beck, Kathryn Louise; Conlon, Cathryn Anne; Kruger, Rozanne; Coad, Jane (2014). "Dietary determinants of and possible solutions to iron deficiency for young women living in industrialized countries: a review". Nutrients. 6 (9): 3747–3776. doi:10.3390/nu6093747. PMC 4179187. PMID 25244367. Wikidata Q34263556.
- Hajar Mazahery; Carlos A. Camargo; Conlon, Cathryn Anne; Beck, Kathryn Louise; Kruger, Marlena C.; Hurst, Pamela Ruth (2016). "Vitamin D and Autism Spectrum Disorder: A Literature Review". Nutrients. 8 (4): 236. doi:10.3390/nu8040236. PMC 4848704. PMID 27110819. Wikidata Q26750537.
