= Rachel Brown (scientist) =

New Zealand nutritional scientist

- Born: 1970 (age 55–56)
- Education: University of Otago
- Known for: Nut and health, obesity and weight loss, sports nutrition
- Scientific career
- Fields: Human nutrition
- Workplaces: University of Otago
- Doctoral students: Lisa Te Morenga

Rachel C. Brown (born 1970) is a New Zealand scientist, professor and deputy head of the Department of Human Nutrition at the University of Otago.

== Academic career ==
Born in 1970, Brown completed a BSc, MSc and PhD (1999) at the University of Otago and joined the university's staff. In December 2019 she, along with two of her colleagues Lisa Houghton and Caroline Horwath, was promoted to full professor with effect from 1 February 2020.

Her research has focused on the dietary benefits of consuming nuts and nutrition for sports people. Her recent studies have compared popular diets—intermittent fasting, Paleolithic and Mediterranean—in a weight-loss trial; looked at the science behind nut activation; and risk of eating disorders among rugby union players as a result of poor body image. Her teaching is in obesity and its effect on heart disease.

Notable students of Brown's include Professor Lisa Te Morenga.

== Selected works ==
- Katherine Black; Joanne Slater; Rachel C Brown; Rebecca Cooke (5 April 2018). "Low Energy Availability, Plasma Lipids, and Hormonal Profiles of Recreational Athletes". The Journal of Strength and Conditioning Research. doi:10.1519/jsc.0000000000002540. ISSN 1064-8011. PMID 29624522. Wikidata Q52602727.
- Melyssa Roy; Sheila M Williams; Rachel C Brown; Kim A Meredith-Jones; Hamish Osborne; Michelle Jospe; Rachael W Taylor (1 September 2018). "High-Intensity Interval Training in the Real World: Outcomes from a 12-Month Intervention in Overweight Adults". Medicine & Science in Sports & Exercise. 50 (9): 1818–1826. doi:10.1249/mss.0000000000001642. ISSN 0195-9131. PMID 29683919. Wikidata Q52570138.
- Sze-Yen Tan; Siew Ling Tey; Rachel Brown (6 October 2018). "Can Nuts Mitigate Malnutrition in Older Adults? A Conceptual Framework". Nutrients. 10 (10). doi:10.3390/nu10101448. ISSN 2072-6643. PMC 6213172. PMID 30301198. Wikidata Q57297133.
- Elizabeth P Neale; Georgie Tran; Rachel Brown (7 December 2020). "Barriers and Facilitators to Nut Consumption: A Narrative Review". International Journal of Environmental Research and Public Health. 17 (23). doi:10.3390/ijerph17239127. ISSN 1660-4601. PMID 33297407. Wikidata Q104140585.
