= Marion Robinson =

New Zealand physiologist and nutritionist (1923–2003)

Marion Robinson CBE
- Born: Marion Frances Harrison; 9 November 1923
- Died: 25 February 2003 (aged 79); Dunedin, New Zealand
- Education: University of Cambridge
- Spouse: James Roper Robinson (m. 1951)
- Awards: Fellow of the Royal Society of New Zealand (1978)
- Scientific career
- Fields: Nutrition, trace elements, physiology
- Workplaces: University of Cambridge; University of Otago

Marion Frances Robinson CBE (née Harrison; 9 November 1923 – 25 February 2003) was a New Zealand nutritionist and physiologist. She was professor of nutrition at the University of Otago, and is particularly noted for her investigation of the importance of selenium in the human diet.

== Early life and family ==
Robinson was born on 9 November 1923, the daughter of Wilfred, a carpenter, and Gladys Harrison. She was educated at Wellington Girls' College and "did well despite a hostile headmistress".

== Academic career ==
Robinson completed a Bachelor of Home Science degree at the University of Otago in May 1945, and followed it immediately with a Master of Home Science degree, graduating in December 1945. Robinson received the Anna P. Stout Scholarship for her Master's research. At that time Home Science was the only way of studying biochemistry outside of a medical degree. Robinson studied the fluorine in dental enamel for her master's degree, having been introduced to the study of trace elements by Muriel Bell.

Robinson moved to the University of Cambridge to work with Professor Robert McCance. She completed a PhD and from 1949 to 1957 was assistant director of research in the Department of Experimental Medicine.

While in Cambridge, Robinson published on the physiology of rat livers. Robinson married James Roper Robinson, a physiologist, in 1951 in Cambridge. Robinson returned to New Zealand with her family in 1957.

Robinson's research focused on trace elements and human nutrition. She set up the first trace element laboratory for the School of Home Sciences at the University of Otago, and became internationally renowned for her work on selenium. In 1980, she became a full professor, with the award of a personal chair in nutrition. In 1985, she worked on the World Health Organisation task group on selenium. She served as the head of the Department of Human Nutrition at Otago between 1985 and 1988, and was conferred with the title of professor emeritus when she retired in 1989.

== Death ==
Robinson died in Dunedin on 25 February 2003, and she is commemorated by a plaque in the Court of Reflections at Andersons Bay Cemetery. She was survived by her husband and twin daughters, who both held doctorates themselves. Her husband died in 2007.

== Honours and awards ==
Robinson was elected a Fellow of the Royal Society of New Zealand in 1978, and a Fellow of New Zealand Institute of Chemistry in 1976. In 1988, she was awarded the prestigious McCollum Award by the American Society for Clinical Nutrition. Following her retirement from Otago, she was appointed a Commander of the Order of the British Empire, for services to nutrition education and research, in the 1990 New Year Honours. Also in 1990, she was awarded honorary life membership of the New Zealand Dietetic Association / Dietitians New Zealand.

In 2017, Robinson was selected as one of the Royal Society Te Apārangi's 150 women in 150 words.

== Selected works ==
- L M BROWN; M F HARRISON (1 July 1951). "Effect of a single injection of carbon tetrachloride upon the activity of the pseudo-cholinesterase in the liver and serum of male and female rats". Nature. 168 (4263): 83–84. doi:10.1038/168083a0. ISSN 1476-4687. PMID 14852965. Wikidata Q59055172.
- M F HARRISON (1 August 1951). "Relation between polyploidy and the amounts of deoxynucleic acid per nucleus in the liver and kidney of adult rats". Nature. 168 (4267): 248–249. doi:10.1038/168248a0. ISSN 1476-4687. PMID 14875063. Wikidata Q59056623.
- M F HARRISON (1 April 1953). "Percentage of binucleate cells in the livers of adult rats". Nature. 171 (4353): 611. doi:10.1038/171611a0. ISSN 1476-4687. PMID 13054653. Wikidata Q59085634.
- C. D. Thomson; C. E. Burton; M. F. Robinson (1 May 1978). "On supplementing the selenium intake of New Zealanders. 1. Short experiments with large doses of selenite or selenomethionine". British Journal of Nutrition. 39 (3): 579–587. doi:10.1079/bjn19780073. ISSN 0007-1145. PMID 638126. Wikidata Q43934879.
- M. F. Robinson; H. M. Rea; G. M. Friend; R. D. Stewart; P. C. Snow; C. D. Thomson (1 May 1978). "On supplementing the selenium intake of New Zealanders. 2. Prolonged metabolic experiments with daily supplements of selenomethionine, selenite and fish". British Journal of Nutrition. 39 (3): 589–600. doi:10.1079/bjn19780074. ISSN 0007-1145. PMID 565216. Wikidata Q39098636.
- Flatt A; Pearce N; Thomson CD; Sears MR; Robinson MF; Beasley R (1 February 1990). "Reduced selenium in asthmatic subjects in New Zealand". Thorax. 45 (2): 95–99. doi:10.1136/thx.45.2.95. ISSN 0040-6376. PMC 462313. PMID 2315881. Wikidata Q36215036.
- A. M. van Rij; C. D. Thomson; J. M. McKenzie; M. F. Robinson (1 October 1979). "Selenium deficiency in total parenteral nutrition" (PDF). The American Journal of Clinical Nutrition. 32 (10): 2076–2085. doi:10.1093/ajcn/32.10.2076. ISSN 0002-9165. PMID 114045. Wikidata Q39686639.
- C. E. Casey; M. F. Robinson (1 May 1978). "Copper, manganese, zinc, nickel, cadmium and lead in human foetal tissues". British Journal of Nutrition. 39 (3): 639–646. doi:10.1079/bjn19780079. ISSN 0007-1145. PMID 638131. Wikidata Q48193141.
- Thomson CD; Robinson MF (1 February 1980). "Selenium in human health and disease with emphasis on those aspects peculiar to New Zealand". The American Journal of Clinical Nutrition. 33 (2): 303–323. doi:10.1093/ajcn/33.2.303. ISSN 0002-9165. PMID 6766657. Wikidata Q40256819.
- HARRISON MF (1 September 1953). "Effect of starvation on the composition of the liver cell". Biochemical Journal. 55 (2): 204–211. doi:10.1042/bj0550204. ISSN 0264-6021. PMC 1269221. PMID 13093665. Wikidata Q39221784.
