= Lisa Te Morenga =

New Zealand nutrition and Māori health researcher

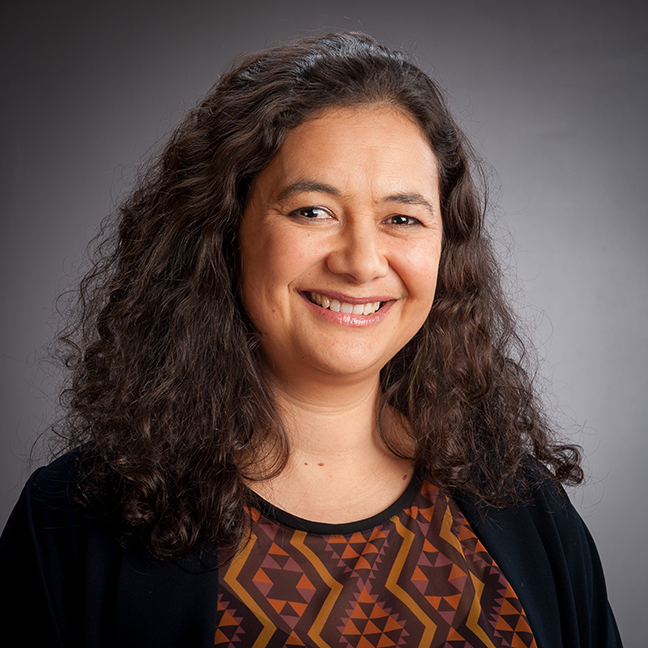
- Awards: Hamilton Award, Rutherford Discovery Fellowship

Academic background
- Education: University of Otago, University of Canterbury
- Doctoral advisor: Jim Mann, Sheila Williams, Rachel Brown

Academic work
- Institutions: Massey University

Lisa Anne Te Morenga (Ngāti Whātua Ōrākei, Te Uri o Hua, Ngāpuhi and Te Rarawa) is a New Zealand Māori academic, and she is a full professor at the Research Centre for Hauora and Health at Massey University. Her research focuses on nutrition and Māori health, especially in relation to dietary interventions to prevent metabolic disease. She is contesting the Te Tai Tonga electorate for the Green Party in the 2026 general election.

== Early life and education ==
Te Morenga whakapapas to Ngāti Whātua Ōrākei, Te Uri o Hua, Ngāpuhi and Te Rarawa.

Te Morenga began her science career with the New Zealand Institute of Forestry as a forestry science graduate at the University of Canterbury, before switching to studying human nutrition. Te Morenga completed a PhD titled The effects of altering macronutrient composition on diabetes risk at the University of Otago in 2010, supervised by Jim Mann, Sheila Williams and Rachel Brown.

== Academic career ==
After completing her doctorate, Te Morenga joined the faculty of the University of Otago as part of the Edgar Diabetes and Obesity Research Centre. She then worked at Victoria University of Wellington, before moving to Massey University, rising to full professor in 2024.

Te Morenga's research focuses on how to prevent and treat obesity, diabetes and cardiovascular disease using dietary interventions. Her work has led to systematic reviews of the effect of sugar levels in the diet and also saturated fat intake and its effect on cardiometabolic disease in children. Her 2012 review of sugar intake in the British Medical Journal was hailed as "providing irrefutable evidence that sugar in the diet contributes to weight gain, resulting in changes to international nutrition policy".

Te Morenga is part of the Riddet Institute Centre of Research Excellence, and the Healthier Lives National Science Challenge, and the Health Coalition Aotearoa.

== Honours and awards ==
In 2019 Te Morenga was awarded the Hamilton Award, which is the Royal Society Te Apārangi's Early Career Research Excellence Award for Science, for "her contribution to international evidence-based nutrition policy stemming from her research examining the impact of dietary sugars on body weight".

In 2021, Te Morenga gained a Rutherford Discovery Fellowship for a project named 'Naku te rourou, nau te rourou, ka oranga ai te iwi (With my food basket and your food basket the people will be well)'. The project involves looking at the impact of eating different types of wholegrain foods on type 2 diabetes and prediabetes, in order improve the advice that dietitians can give people who have or are at risk of disease and to guide food manufacturers to improve products. Te Morenga will also look at sugar intake levels and investigate how those can be reduced, and work with Māori communities to design dietary interventions that are culturally appropriate.

== Politics ==
Te Morenga joined the Green Party in 2009. She was announced as the Green Party candidate for Te Tai Tonga in June 2026. She was ranked 46th place on the Green Party's list.

During the 2026 New Zealand general election held on 7 November, Te Morenga came second place in the Te Tonga contest, gaining 5,841 votes based on preliminary results. Due to her low party list ranking, she was not elected into Parliament on the Green Party list.

== Selected works ==
- Te Morenga, Lisa; Mallard, Simonette; Mann, Jim Joel Ivor (2012). "Dietary sugars and body weight: systematic review and meta-analyses of randomised controlled trials and cohort studies". The BMJ. 346 e7492. doi:10.1136/bmj.e7492. PMID 23321486. Wikidata Q34035107.
- Reynolds, Andrew Nathan; Mann, Jim Joel Ivor; Cummings, John; Winter, Nicola; Mete, Evelyn; Te Morenga, Lisa (2019). "Carbohydrate quality and human health: a series of systematic reviews and meta-analyses". The Lancet. 393 (10170): 434–445. doi:10.1016/s0140-6736(18)31809-9. PMID 30638909. Wikidata Q60587692.
- Te Morenga, Lisa; Howatson, Alex J; Jones, Rhiannon M; Mann, Jim Joel Ivor (2014). "Dietary sugars and cardiometabolic risk: systematic review and meta-analyses of randomized controlled trials of the effects on blood pressure and lipids". The American Journal of Clinical Nutrition. 100 (1): 65–79. doi:10.3945/ajcn.113.081521. PMID 24808490. Wikidata Q34040872.
- Te Morenga, Lisa; Montez, Jason M (2017). "Health effects of saturated and trans-fatty acid intake in children and adolescents: Systematic review and meta-analysis". PLOS One. 12 (11) e0186672. doi:10.1371/journal.pone.0186672. PMC 5693282. PMID 29149184. Wikidata Q47095427.
- Eyles, Helen; Jull, Andrew; Dobson, Rosie; Firestone, Ridvan; Whittaker, Robyn; Te Morenga, Lisa; Goodwin, Deborah; Cliona Ni Mhurchu (2016). "Co-design of mHealth Delivered Interventions: A Systematic Review to Assess Key Methods and Processes". Current Nutrition Reports. 5 (3): 160–167. doi:10.1007/s13668-016-0165-7. Wikidata Q57752640.
- Kataoka, M; Venn, Bernard Joseph; Williams, Sheila M.; Te Morenga, Lisa; Heemels, I M; Mann, Jim Joel Ivor (2013). "Glycaemic responses to glucose and rice in people of Chinese and European ethnicity". Diabetic Medicine. 30 (3): e101-7. doi:10.1111/dme.12080. PMID 23181689. Wikidata Q38062578.
- Te Morenga, Lisa; Levers, Megan T; Williams, Sheila M.; Brown, Rachel Clare; Mann, Jim Joel Ivor (2011). "Comparison of high protein and high fiber weight-loss diets in women with risk factors for the metabolic syndrome: a randomized trial". Nutrition Journal. 10: 40. doi:10.1186/1475-2891-10-40. PMC 3105953. PMID 21524314. Wikidata Q35019185.
