= Sheila Skeaff =

New Zealand nutritionist and dietary researcher

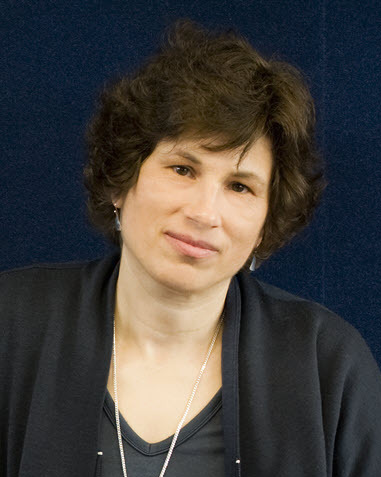
- Skeaff in 2009
- Born: 1961 (age 63–64); Canada
- Education: University of Guelph
- Alma mater: University of Otago
- Known for: food literacy, iodine deficiency
- Spouse: Murray Skeaff
- Scientific career
- Fields: Nutrition
- Institutions: University of Otago
- Doctoral advisor: Christine Thomson

Sheila Anne Skeaff (born 1961) is a Canadian-born New Zealand nutritionist and full professor at the University of Otago. Her research focusses on food literacy, sustainable diets and iodine deficiency.

== Academic career ==
Skeaff was born in 1961 and grew up in northern Ontario and graduated with an MSc in nutritional biochemistry from the University of Guelph in Canada in 1988. She and her husband Murray Skeaff moved to Dunedin to work at the University of Otago in mid-1989. She completed a PhD in human nutrition in 2004, under the supervision of Christine Thomson.

In March 2018 Skeaff received a teaching excellence award from the University of Otago.

== Selected works ==
- Louise Brough; Barbara M Thomson; Sheila A Skeaff (2 December 2015). "Revisiting the Iodine Global Network's definition of iodine status by country". British Journal of Nutrition. 115 (2): 374–376. doi:10.1017/S0007114515004389. ISSN 0007-1145. PMID 26627636.
- Andrew N Reynolds; Sheila A Skeaff (9 October 2017). "Maternal adherence with recommendations for folic acid and iodine supplements: A cross-sectional survey". Australian and New Zealand Journal of Obstetrics and Gynaecology. doi:10.1111/AJO.12719. ISSN 0004-8666. PMID 28990157.
- Harriet A L Harrex; Sheila A Skeaff; Katherine E Black; et al. (20 November 2017). "Sleep timing is associated with diet and physical activity levels in 9-11-year-old children from Dunedin, New Zealand: the PEDALS study". Journal of Sleep Research. 27 (4) e12634. doi:10.1111/JSR.12634. ISSN 0962-1105. PMID 29160021.
- Abby G Ershow; Sheila A Skeaff; Joyce M Merkel; Pamela R Pehrsson (17 January 2018). "Development of Databases on Iodine in Foods and Dietary Supplements". Nutrients. 10 (1). doi:10.3390/NU10010100. ISSN 2072-6643. PMC 5793328. PMID 29342090.
- Ying Jin; Jane Coad; Shao Jia Zhou; Sheila Skeaff; Cheryl Benn; Nick D. Kim; Rachael L Pond; Louise Brough (27 August 2020). "Mother and Infant Nutrition Investigation in New Zealand (MINI Project): Protocol for an Observational Longitudinal Cohort Study". JMIR Research Protocols. 9 (8) e18560. doi:10.2196/18560. ISSN 1929-0748. PMC 7484772. PMID 32852279.
