= Pamela von Hurst =

New Zealand nutritionist

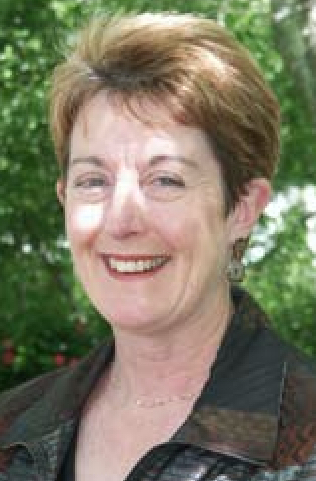

Academic background
- Education: Massey University, Massey University
- Thesis: The role of vitamin D in metabolism and bone health (2009)
- Doctoral advisor: Jane Coad, Marlena Kruger, Welma Stonehouse

Pamela Ruth von Hurst is a New Zealand academic and is a full professor at Massey University, specialising in human nutrition.

== Academic career ==
von Hurst completed a PhD titled The role of vitamin D in metabolism and bone health at Massey University. von Hurst then joined the faculty at Massey, rising to full professor in 2021. She established and is co-director of the Massey Vitamin D Research Centre, and is a part of the Riddet Institute Centre of Research Excellence. von Hurst has been President of the Nutrition Society of New Zealand. In 2017 she represented New Zealand at the International Union of Nutritional Sciences.

von Hurst's research focuses health and nutrition in children, physical activity, metabolic syndrome and health and disease. She says she is "interested in the prevention of chronic disease by achieving optimum nutrition and lifestyle, including physical activity. My main platform of research currently is investigating the role of vitamin D in health and disease. I am also interested in the interaction of genes and nutrients, and investigating the role of genetic differences in determining response to nutritional deficiencies". With her doctoral advisor Marlene Kruger she led research on the health benefits of drinking deer milk for preventing bone loss in older women. She led a High Value Nutrition-funded study on the effect of mussel consumption on osteoarthritis. von Hurst has reviewed Ministry of Health guidelines on sun exposure and vitamin D, was part of a Technical Advisory Group developing guidelines for eating and physical activity, and co-led a join New Zealand–Australian working group to develop a Federation of Oceanic Nutrition Societies.

== Selected works ==
- Hurst, Pamela Ruth; Oosthuizen, Welma; Coad, Jane (2009). "Vitamin D supplementation reduces insulin resistance in South Asian women living in New Zealand who are insulin resistant and vitamin D deficient - a randomised, placebo-controlled trial". British Journal of Nutrition. 103 (4): 549–555. doi:10.1017/s0007114509992017. PMID 19781131. Wikidata Q34019552.
- Kathryn L. Beck; Jasmine S. Thomson; Richard J. Swift; Pamela R. von Hurst (2015). "Role of nutrition in performance enhancement and postexercise recovery". Open Access Journal of Sports Medicine. 6: 259-67, 259. doi:10.2147/oajsm.s33605. PMC 4540168. PMID 26316828. Wikidata Q26796400.
- Hajar Mazahery; Pamela R. von Hurst (2015). "Factors Affecting 25-Hydroxyvitamin D Concentration in Response to Vitamin D Supplementation". Nutrients. 7 (7): 5111–5142. doi:10.3390/nu7075111. PMC 4516990. PMID 26121531. Wikidata Q35894937.
- Hurst, Pamela Ruth; Carol A Wham (2007). "Attitudes and knowledge about osteoporosis risk prevention: a survey of New Zealand women". Public Health Nutrition. 10 (7): 747–753. doi:10.1017/s1368980007441477. PMID 17381949. Wikidata Q48408331.
- Hajar Mazahery; Carlos A. Camargo; Conlon, Cathryn Anne; Beck, Kathryn Louise; Kruger, Marlena C.; Hurst, Pamela Ruth (2016). "Vitamin D and Autism Spectrum Disorder: A Literature Review". Nutrients. 8 (4): 236. doi:10.3390/nu8040236. PMC 4848704. PMID 27110819. Wikidata Q26750537.
