= Nutrition (disambiguation) =

Nutrition may refer to:

- Nutrition, the process by which an organism uses food to sustain life:
  - Human nutrition
  - Animal nutrition
  - Plant nutrition
- Nutritional science or nutrition science
- Nutrition (journal), a medical journal
- "Nutrition", a song by Hieroglyphics from the album The Kitchen
