= Rachael Taylor (disambiguation) =

Rachael Taylor (born 1984) is an Australian actress and model.

Rachael or Rachel Taylor may also refer to:

- Rachael Taylor (rower) (born 1976), Australian rower
- Rachael Taylor (academic) (born 1971), New Zealand childhood nutrition academic
- Rachel Taylor (politician), British Labour Party Member of Parliament
- Rachel Taylor (rugby union) (born 1983), Welsh rugby union player
- Rachel Annand Taylor (1876–1960), Scottish poet
