= Carol Wham =

New Zealand scientist

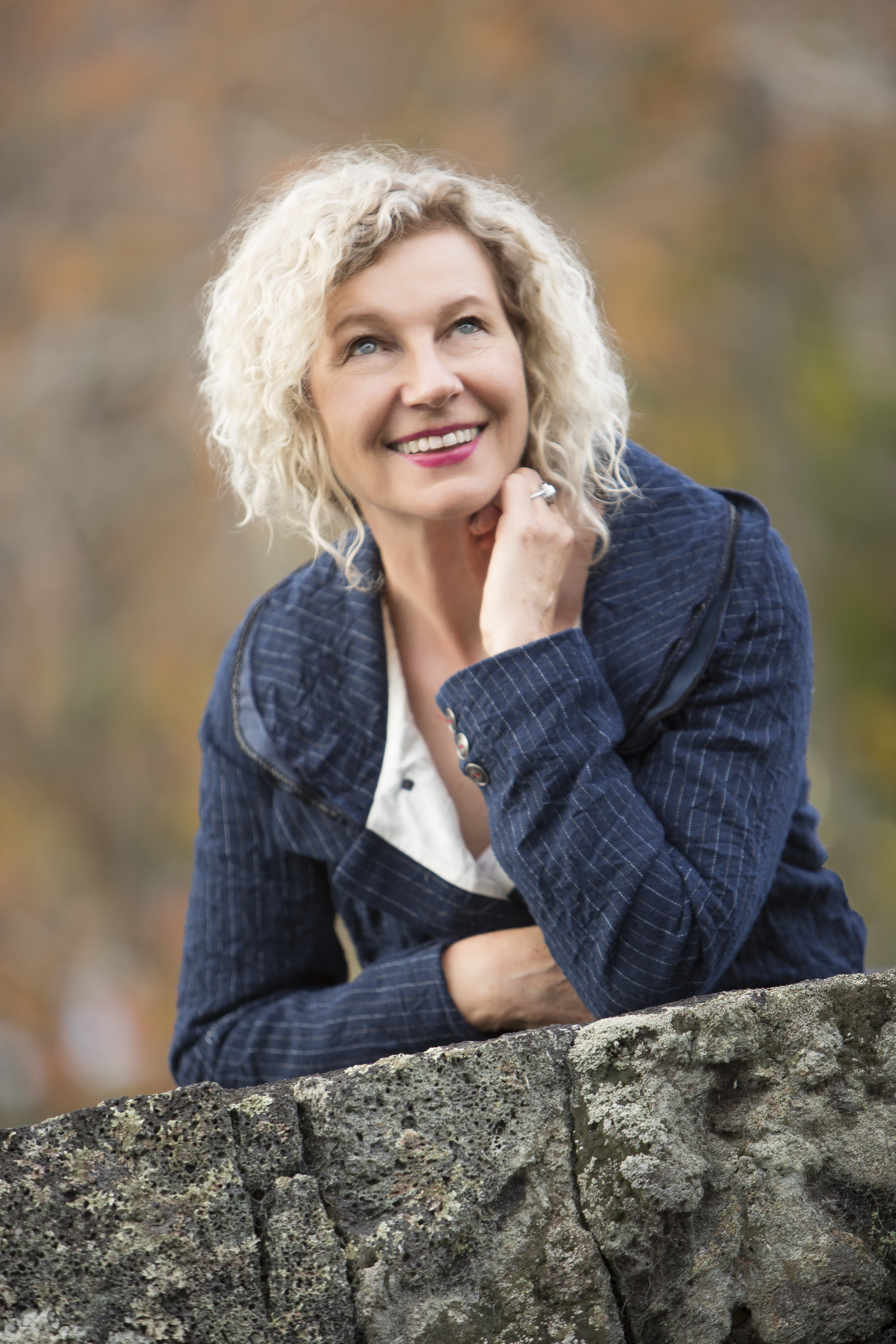
- Carol Wham in 2017
- Other name: Carol Anne Wham
- Education: University of Otago; University of Adelaide
- Scientific career
- Fields: Public health; Nutrition science
- Workplaces: Massey University
- Thesis: Changing New Zealanders' attitudes to milk? (2000)

Carol Anne Wham is a New Zealand scientist and professor of public health nutrition at Massey University.

== Academic career ==
Wham graduated with a MSc from the University of Otago in 1994 and then moved to the University of Adelaide to undertake her PhD, with a thesis titled "Changing New Zealanders' attitudes to milk?". She returned to New Zealand, where she has been on the staff of Massey University since 2006.

In November 2019 Wham was promoted to full professor in the College of Health at Massey University with effect from 1 January 2020.

== Selected publications ==
- Anishka Ram; Ngaire Kerse; Simon A Moyes; Marama Muru-Lanning; Carol Wham (14 July 2020). "Dietary Protein Intake and Determinants in Māori and Non-Māori Octogenarians. Te Puāwaitanga o Ngā Tapuwae Kia Ora Tonu: Life and Living in Advanced Age: A Cohort Study in New Zealand". Nutrients. 12 (7). doi:10.3390/nu12072079. ISSN 2072-6643. PMC 7400903. PMID 32674307. Wikidata Q97564410.
- Carol Wham; Allie Smithers; Rozanne Kruger; Hajar Mazahery; Marilize Richter (9 December 2020). "Factors associated with low-intake dehydration among older inpatients-A pilot study". Australasian Journal on Ageing. 40 (2). doi:10.1111/ajag.12894. ISSN 1440-6381. PMID 33295084. Wikidata Q104137113.
- Chris Vogliano; Jessica Evelyn Raneri; Josephine Maelaua; Jane Coad; Carol Wham; Barbara Burlingame (23 December 2020). "Assessing Diet Quality of Indigenous Food Systems in Three Geographically Distinct Solomon Islands Sites (Melanesia, Pacific Islands)". Nutrients. 13 (1). doi:10.3390/nu13010030. ISSN 2072-6643. PMC 7823421. PMID 33374877. Wikidata Q104613478.
