= Eliza Bliss-Moreau =

American neuroscientist

Eliza Bliss-Moreau is a core scientist in the Neuroscience and Behaviour Unit at the California National Primate Research Center and an assistant professor in the Department of Psychology at the University of California, Davis. Her work focuses on the biology of emotions in humans and animals, and since the Zika virus epidemic she has been studying the effects of the virus on the developing brain.

== Professional history ==
Bliss-Moreau attended Boston College, where she received her Bachelor of Science in biology and psychology with honors in 2002, and her Ph.D. in psychology in 2008. This is also where she met Lisa Feldman Barrett and worked under her, eventually running the Barrett Lab during her senior undergraduate year. After completing her education at Boston College, she moved to the University of California, Davis and worked with David Amaral, training as a neurosurgeon while working in his lab. She now runs her own lab, the Bliss-Moreau Lab which "conducts comparative and translational affective science using multimethod, multispecies approaches to understand the social and affective lives of humans and nonhuman animals."

== Honors and awards ==
- American Psychological Association Distinguished Scientific Awards for Early Career Contribution to Psychology (in animal learning and behavior, comparative), 2018.
- Murray B. Gardner Junior Faculty Research Fellowship in Infectious Disease, 2017 -2018.
- Kavli Fellow, National Academy of Sciences, 2016.
- Visiting Research Fellowship, University of New South Wales, Sydney, Australia, 2014.
- “Rising Star” Award, Association for Psychological Science 2013.
- Excellence in Postdoctoral Research Award, University of California Davis, 2013.
- Commitment to Community Award, Boston College Graduate School of Arts & Sciences, 2008.
- Boston College Graduate Student Award for Service and Leadership, 2006.

== Selected publications ==
- Lindquist, Kristen A.; Wager, Tor D.; Kober, Hedy; Bliss-Moreau, Eliza; Barrett, Lisa Feldman (2012). "The brain basis of emotion: A meta-analytic review". Behavioral and Brain Sciences. 35 (3): 121–143. doi:10.1017/S0140525X11000446. PMC 4329228. PMID 22617651.
- Kober, Hedy; Barrett, Lisa Feldman; Joseph, Josh; Bliss-Moreau, Eliza; Lindquist, Kristen; Wager, Tor D. (2008). "Functional grouping and cortical–subcortical interactions in emotion: A meta-analysis of neuroimaging studies". NeuroImage. 42 (2): 998–1031. doi:10.1016/j.neuroimage.2008.03.059. PMC 2752702. PMID 18579414.
- Barrett, Lisa Feldman; Bliss‐Moreau, Eliza (2009). Chapter 4 Affect as a Psychological Primitive. Advances in Experimental Social Psychology. Vol. 41. pp. 167–218. doi:10.1016/S0065-2601(08)00404-8. ISBN 9780123744722. PMC 2884406. PMID 20552040.
