= Daniel J. Barrett =

American writer, engineer and musician

- Born: 1963 (age 62–63); United States
- Education: University of Pennsylvania; Johns Hopkins University; University of Massachusetts Amherst
- Occupations: writer; software engineer
- Spouse: Lisa Feldman Barrett
- Writing career
- Years active: 1992–present
- Genres: technology; music
- Subjects: Linux; internet; macOS; MediaWiki; security; Amiga OS; progressive rock
- Website: danieljbarrett.com

Daniel J. Barrett is a writer, software engineer, musician, and author of technology books.

== Career ==
=== Writing ===
Barrett has written a number of technical books on computer topics. The most well-known are Linux Pocket Guide and SSH, The Secure Shell: The Definitive Guide. His books have been translated into Chinese, Czech, French, German, Hungarian, Italian, Japanese, Korean, Polish, Portuguese, Russian, and Spanish.

=== Corporate use of MediaWiki ===
Barrett, author of the book MediaWiki (ISBN 978-0-596-51979-7), has received media coverage for his deployment of MediaWiki in corporate environments.

=== Gentle Giant ===
Barrett has been active in the resurgence of 1970s progressive rock band Gentle Giant from the 1990s onward. He created the official Gentle Giant Home Page in 1994, and though it began as a fan site, it was adopted by the band and is listed as the "Official Gentle Giant website" on the band's CD re-releases.

In 1996, Barrett compiled a 2-CD set of their songs for PolyGram entitled Edge of Twilight. Later, he also helped to coordinate the creation of the boxed sets Under Construction and Unburied Treasure.

In 1988, Barrett wrote and recorded the song "Find the Longest Path," a parody incorporating an NP-complete problem in computer science and the frustrations of graduate school. It has been played at mathematics conferences, incorporated into several YouTube videos by other people, and independently performed by a choral ensemble at ACM SIGCSE 2013. Computer scientist Robert Sedgewick ends his algorithms course on Coursera with this song.

== Bibliography ==
- Barrett, Daniel J., Bandits on the Information Superhighway, 1996, ISBN 1-56592-156-9.
- Barrett, Daniel J., NetResearch: Finding Information Online, 1997, ISBN 1-56592-245-X.
- Barrett, Daniel J., Polylingual Systems: An Approach to Seamless Interoperability, Doctoral dissertation, University of Massachusetts Amherst, February 1998.
- Barrett, Daniel J., and Silverman, Richard E., SSH, The Secure Shell: The Definitive Guide, 2001, ISBN 0-596-00011-1.
- Barrett, Daniel J., Silverman, Richard E., Byrnes, Robert A., Linux Security Cookbook, 2003, ISBN 0-596-00391-9.
- Barrett, Daniel J., Linux Pocket Guide, 2004, ISBN 0-596-00628-4.
- Barrett, Daniel J., Silverman, Richard E., Byrnes, Robert A., SSH, The Secure Shell: The Definitive Guide, Second Edition, 2005, ISBN 0-596-00895-3.
- Barrett, Daniel J., MediaWiki, October 2008, ISBN 978-0-596-51979-7.
- Barrett, Daniel J., Linux Pocket Guide, Second Edition, March 2012, ISBN 1-4493-1669-7.
- Barrett, Daniel J., Macintosh Terminal Pocket Guide, June 2012, ISBN 1-4493-2834-2.
- Barrett, Daniel J., Linux Pocket Guide, Third Edition, June 2016, ISBN 1-4919-2757-7.
- Barrett, Daniel J., Efficient Linux at the Command Line, March 2022, ISBN 978-1-098-11340-7.
- Barrett, Daniel J., Linux Pocket Guide, Fourth Edition, March 2024, ISBN 978-1-098-15796-8.
- Barrett, Daniel J., Responsible Software Engineering, in preparation. ISBN 978-1-098-14915-4.
