= Society for Affective Science =

Scientific and professional organization

- Formation: September 2013; 13 years ago
- President: Maya Tamir
- Publication: Affective Science
- Website: society-for-affective-science.org

The Society for Affective Science is a non-profit organization dedicated to fostering basic and applied research on affect. It was founded in 2013 by Lisa Feldman Barrett and James Gross.
