= Jane Coad =

New Zealand public health nutrition scientist

Jane Coad is a New Zealand public health nutrition researcher and professor in nutrition at Massey University. She is co-director of Massey's Vitamin D Research Centre which she and Pam von Hurst founded in 2010.

== Academic career ==
In September 2015 Coad was promoted to full professor at Massey University, with effect from 1 January 2016.

In addition to her work in nutrition, Coad is co-author of Anatomy and Physiology for Midwives, now in its 4th edition.

Notable doctoral students include Kathryn Beck.

== Selected publications ==
=== Book ===
- Coad, Jane; Pedley, Kevin; Dunstall, Melvyn (2019), Anatomy and physiology for midwives (4th ed.), Elsevier, ISBN 978-0-7020-6668-9

=== Journal articles ===
- Bolaji L Ilesanmi-Oyelere; Jane Coad; Nicole C Roy; Marlena Kruger (22 October 2020). "Dietary Patterns, Body Composition, and Bone Health in New Zealand Postmenopausal Women". Frontiers in Nutrition. 7 563689. doi:10.3389/FNUT.2020.563689. ISSN 2296-861X. PMC 7642099. PMID 33195365.
- Ying Jin; Jane Coad; Shao Jia Zhou; Sheila Skeaff; Cheryl Benn; Louise Brough (22 October 2020). "Use of Iodine Supplements by Breastfeeding Mothers Is Associated with Better Maternal and Infant Iodine Status". Biological Trace Element Research. 199 (8): 2893–2903. doi:10.1007/S12011-020-02438-8. ISSN 0163-4984. PMID 33094447.
- Karen Mumme; Cath Conlon; Pamela von Hurst; et al. (8 November 2020). "Dietary Patterns, Their Nutrients, and Associations with Socio-Demographic and Lifestyle Factors in Older New Zealand Adults". Nutrients. 12 (11): 3425. doi:10.3390/NU12113425. ISSN 2072-6643. PMC 7695209. PMID 33171602.
- Jane Coad; Kevin Pedley (9 November 2020). "Nutrition in New Zealand: Can the Past Offer Lessons for the Present and Guidance for the Future?". Nutrients. 12 (11): 3433. doi:10.3390/NU12113433. ISSN 2072-6643. PMC 7697857. PMID 33182406.
- Chris Vogliano; Jessica Evelyn Raneri; Josephine Maelaua; Jane Coad; Carol Wham; Barbara Burlingame (23 December 2020). "Assessing Diet Quality of Indigenous Food Systems in Three Geographically Distinct Solomon Islands Sites (Melanesia, Pacific Islands)". Nutrients. 13 (1): 30. doi:10.3390/NU13010030. ISSN 2072-6643. PMC 7823421. PMID 33374877.
