= Dietary inflammatory index =

Score of dietary inflammation

The Dietary Inflammatory Index (DII) is a numerical score that assesses a diet for its effect on several biomarkers linked to inflammation. Its theoretical bounds are −8.87 to +7.98, and it is oriented such that negative scores are more anti-inflammatory and more positive scores are pro-inflammatory. The DII has been linked to many chronic diseases, including arthritis, cardiovascular diseases, inflammatory bowel diseases, diabetes, and many types of cancer (such as esophageal cancer). Variants include an energy-adjusted E-DII and a children's C-DII.

== History and development ==
The development of the DII began in 2004, and the first version of the DII debuted in December 2009. However, this older version was never used in a published paper. It had several drawbacks, such as being statistically biased, omitting the impact of flavonoids, and being reversed (scoring inflammatory diets as negative). A new, revised DII was released in 2014. This version quickly gained favor as a research tool for the study of diet-associated inflammation and health-related outcomes, and is the version commonly referred to as the DII. The E-DII was developed later. At the request of the USDA, a children's DII was developed in 2018.

== Validation ==
The DII has been subjected to construct validation. It is correlated with several inflammatory markers, including interleukin 1 beta, interleukin 4, interleukin 6, interleukin 10, tumor necrosis factor TNFα-R2, C-reactive protein, and homocysteine, both individually and as a combined inflammatory biomarker score.

== Availability ==
The weights of the DII are published in the 2014 paper. However, computing DII scores requires a nutrition database and normalizing dietary scores relative to the world standard food intake, and the original authors observed significant errors in the published literature. The E-DII and C-DII require unique comparative databases which are products of Connecting Health Innovations and are not publicly available.

== See also ==
- Nutritional immunology
