= Caroline Horwath =

New Zealand nutritional scientist

- Other name: Caroline Christine Horwath
- Education: University of Adelaide
- Scientific career
- Fields: Human nutrition
- Workplaces: University of Otago
- Thesis: A random population study of the dietary habits of elderly people (1987)

Caroline Christine Horwath is a New Zealand nutritional scientist and professor in the Department of Human Nutrition at the University of Otago.

== Academic career ==
Horwath graduated from the University of Adelaide with a PhD in 1987. Her thesis was titled "A random population study of the dietary habits of elderly people". She subsequently joined the University of Otago as a lecturer in the Department of Human Nutrition. In December 2019 she, along with two of her colleagues Lisa Houghton and Rachel Brown, was promoted to full professor with effect from 1 February 2020.

== Selected works ==
- Eliana Carraça; Sook Ling Leong; Caroline C Horwath (13 December 2018). "Weight-Focused Physical Activity Is Associated with Poorer Eating Motivation Quality and Lower Intuitive Eating in Women". Journal of the Academy of Nutrition and Dietetics. 119 (5): 750–759. doi:10.1016/j.jand.2018.09.011. ISSN 2212-2672. PMID 30555020. Wikidata Q90568235.
- Caroline Horwath; Désirée Hagmann; Christina Hartmann (22 December 2018). "Intuitive eating and food intake in men and women: Results from the Swiss food panel study". Appetite. 135: 61–71. doi:10.1016/j.appet.2018.12.036. ISSN 0195-6663. PMID 30584896. Wikidata Q90748933.
- Helen Paterson; Gareth Treharne; Caroline Horwath; Jillian J Haszard; Peter Herbison; E Jean C Hay-Smith (9 July 2019). "Intuitive eating and gestational weight gain". Eating Behaviors. 34 101311. doi:10.1016/j.eatbeh.2019.101311. ISSN 1471-0153. PMID 31330479. Wikidata Q92079209.
