= Lisa Feldman Barrett =

American psychological scientist and neuroscientist

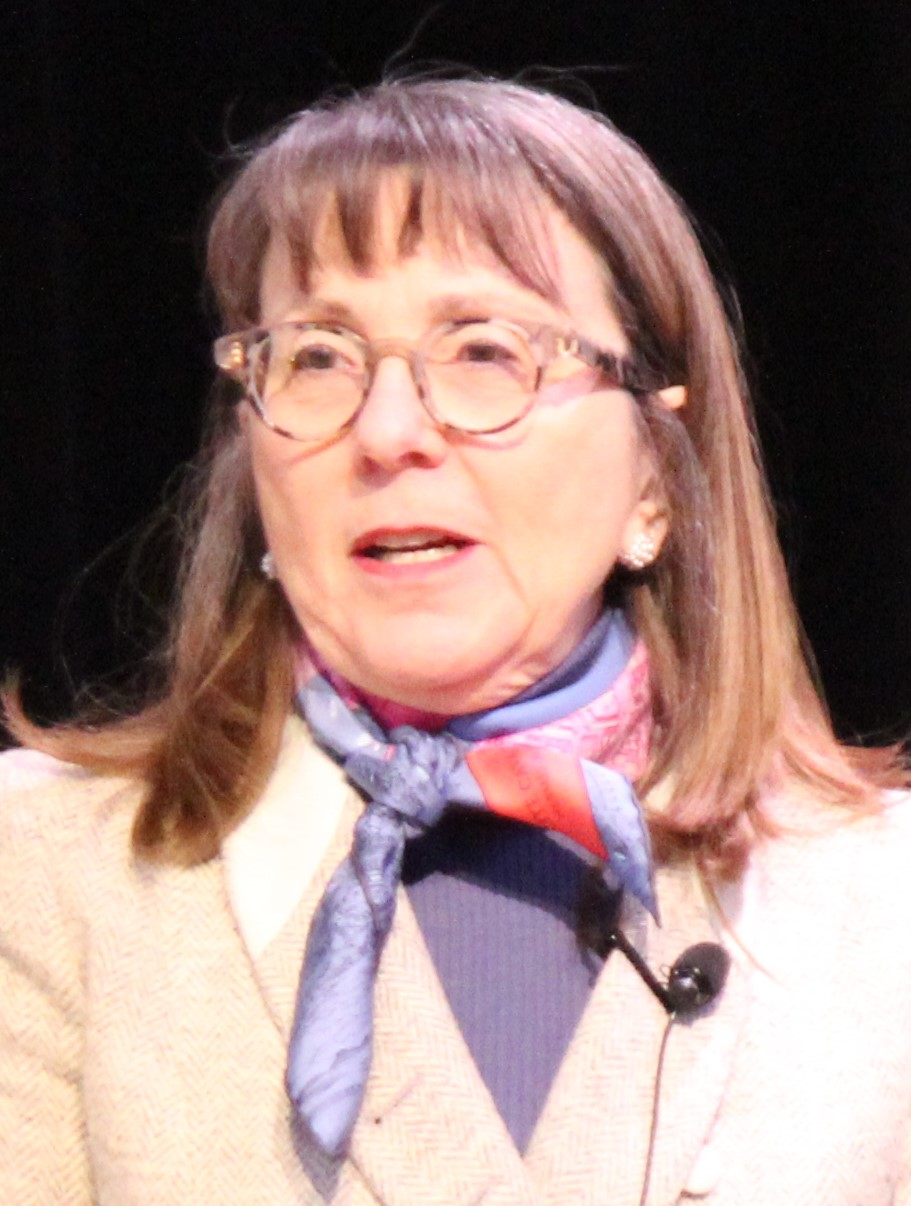
- Barrett in 2024
- Born: 1963 (age 62–63); Toronto, Ontario, Canada
- Citizenship: United States, Canada
- Education: University of Toronto; University of Waterloo
- Known for: Theory of constructed emotion
- Spouse: Daniel J. Barrett
- Awards: APA Award for Distinguished Scientific Contributions; Guggenheim Fellowship; NIH Director's Pioneer Award; William James Fellow Award
- Scientific career
- Fields: Clinical psychology
- Workplaces: Northeastern University; Massachusetts General Hospital; Boston College; Pennsylvania State University
- Thesis: On the failure to differentiate anxiety and depression in self-report (1992)
- Doctoral advisor: Mike Ross
- Doctoral students: Tamlin Conner
- Website: lisafeldmanbarrett.com, affective-science.org

Lisa Feldman Barrett is a Canadian-American psychologist. She is a Distinguished Professor of psychology at Northeastern University, where she focuses on affective science and co-directs the Interdisciplinary Affective Science Laboratory. She has received the William James Fellow Award from the Association for Psychological Science for 2025, and the Award for Distinguished Scientific Contributions from the American Psychological Association for 2021, as well as a Guggenheim Fellowship. Along with James Russell, she is the founding editor-in-chief of the journal Emotion Review. Along with James Gross, she founded the Society for Affective Science.

== Biography ==
Barrett was born in 1963 in Toronto, Ontario, Canada, to a working poor family and was the first member of her extended family to attend university. After graduating from the University of Toronto with honors, she pursued a Ph.D. in clinical psychology at the University of Waterloo with the goal of becoming a therapist, until a frustrating puzzle sidetracked her from a clinical career. As a graduate student, she failed eight times to replicate a simple experiment, finally realizing that her seeming failed attempts were, in fact, successfully replicating a previously undiscovered phenomenon. The resulting research direction became her life's work: understanding the nature of emotion in the brain. Following a clinical internship at the University of Manitoba Medical School, she held professorships in psychology at Penn State University, Boston College, and Northeastern University. Over two decades, she transitioned from clinical psychology into social psychology, psychophysiology, cognitive science, and cognitive neuroscience.

Barrett is most inspired by William James, Wilhelm Wundt, and Charles Darwin. In 2019–2020, she served as president of the Association for Psychological Science. From 2018–2025, she was ranked in the top one percent of the most-cited scientists in the world over a ten-year period.

In addition to academic work, Barrett has written two science books for the public, How Emotions are Made (2017) and Seven and a Half Lessons About the Brain (2020), and her TED talk was among the 25 most popular worldwide in 2018.

== Professional history ==
=== Study of human emotions ===
At the beginning of her career, Barrett's research focused on the structure of affect, having developed experience-sampling methods and open-source software to study emotional experience. Barrett and members at the Interdisciplinary Affective Science Laboratory study the nature of how the brain creates the mind broadly from social-psychological, psychophysiological, cognitive science, and neuroscience perspectives, and take inspiration from anthropology, philosophy, and linguistics. They also explore the relationship between emotion and vision and other psychological phenomena.

In 2010, she joined the psychology faculty at Northeastern University. Before that, she held academic positions at Boston College (1996-2010) and was an assistant professor of clinical psychology at Pennsylvania State University. Notable doctoral students of Barrett's include Tamlin Conner.

Her research has focused on the main issues in the science of emotions such as:

- What are the basic building blocks of emotional life?
- Why is it that people quickly and effortlessly perceive anger, sadness, fear in themselves and others, yet scientists have been unable to specify a set of clear criteria for empirically identifying these emotional events?
- What roles do language and conceptual knowledge play in emotion perception
- Are there really differences between the emotional lives of men and women (see Sex differences in psychology § Emotion)

=== Theory of constructed emotion ===
Barrett developed her current theory of constructed emotion originally during her graduate training.

According to Barrett, emotions are "not universal, but vary from culture to culture" (see Emotions and culture). She says that emotions "are not triggered; you create them. They emerge as a combination of the physical properties of your body, a flexible brain that wires itself to whatever environment it develops in, and your culture and upbringing, which provide that environment.". Barrett also claims that "Smiling was an invention of the Middle Ages" and that smiling "became popular only in the eighteenth century as dentistry became more accessible and affordable".

== Honors and awards ==
- Independent Scientist Research (K02) Award, National Institute of Mental Health, 2002–2007.
- Fellow, Association for Psychological Science, 2003.
- Fellow, Society for Personality and Social Psychology, 2005.
- Fellow, American Psychological Association, 2005.
- Career Trajectory Award, Society of Experimental Social Psychology, 2006.
- Cattell Fund Fellowship, 2007–2008.
- NIH Director's Pioneer Award, 2007–2012, to study how the brain creates emotion.
- Kavli Fellow, National Academy of Sciences, 2008.
- Elected Fellow, American Association for the Advancement of Science, 2008.
- Arts in Academics award, University of Waterloo, 2010.
- Excellence in Research and Creative Activity Award, Northeastern University, 2012.
- Elected Fellow, Royal Society of Canada, 2012.
- Award for Distinguished Service in Psychological Science, American Psychological Association, 2013.
- Elected Fellow, Society of Experimental Psychologists, 2013.
- Diener Award in Social Psychology, Society for Personality and Social Psychology, 2014.
- Heritage Wall of Fame, Foundation for Personality and Social Psychology, 2016.
- Mentor Award for Lifetime Achievement, Association for Psychological Science, 2018.
- Elected Fellow, American Academy of Arts and Sciences, 2018.
- President, Association for Psychological Science, 2019–2020.
- Guggenheim Fellowship in neuroscience, 2019.
- John P. McGovern Award in the Behavioral Sciences, American Association for the Advancement of Science, 2020.
- APA Award for Distinguished Scientific Contributions, American Psychological Association, 2021.
- Mentorship Award in Affective Science, Society for Affective Science, 2022.
- Ruhr Award for Philosophy and the Mind Sciences, Ruhr University Bochum, 2024
- Paul D. MacLean Award for Outstanding Neuroscience Research in Psychosomatic Medicine, American Psychosomatic Society, 2024.
- Laureat, Pufendorf Lectures, Department of Philosophy, Lund University, 2024.
- William James Fellow Award, Association for Psychological Science, 2025.

== Books ==
- Seven and a Half Lessons About the Brain. Houghton Mifflin Harcourt, 2020. ISBN 0358157145.
- How Emotions are Made: The Secret Life of the Brain. Houghton Mifflin Harcourt, 2017. ISBN 0544133315.
- Handbook of Emotions, Fourth Edition. Guilford Fubn, 2018
- The Psychological Construction of Emotion, Guilford Fubn, 2014

== See also ==
- Sapir–Whorf hypothesis
- List of University of Waterloo people
