= Chrononutrition =

Study of the effects of timing for nutrition

Chrononutrition studies timing-related aspects of nutrition, especially with consideration of circadian rhythms. Through careful timing and consideration when eating, the body is able to synchronize different organs and tissues that are related to food digestion, absorption, or metabolism, such as the stomach, gut, liver, pancreas, or adipose tissues. Disruptions to circadian rhythms lead to increased adiposity and cardiometabolic risk factors. Synchronization through meal frequency and regularity helps to garner good health and promote healthy weight regulation through many different biological systems.

== History ==
In 1986, French physician Alain Delabos introduced the idea that food consumption should be aligned with the body's natural (circadian) rhythms. He proposed that larger meals should be consumed earlier in the day and lighter meals in the evening, suggesting that specific nutrients are better processed at certain times; for example, carbohydrates are better processed in the morning and proteins later in the day. These early ideas laid the foundation for a growing body of research exploring how the timing of food intake influences metabolic health.

A major milestone in the field came with the discovery of peripheral clocks in metabolic organs (e.g. liver, adipose tissue). In addition, research began to include not just meal timing but also meal frequency and regularity. Building on these two in conjunction, researchers began to study the effects of irregular eating patterns, finding correlations with increased risk for obesity, type 2 diabetes, and cardiovascular disease. Studies showed that consistent eating patterns that are aligned with circadian rhythms could positively impact metabolic health. This led to the development of dietary strategies like time-restricted feeding, where food intake is limited to specific windows during the day, aiming to optimize metabolic outcomes.

Today, chrononutrition is a multidisciplinary field that spans nutritional genomics, chronobiology, and metabolic research. It emphasizes the importance of not only what we eat, but when we eat, highlighting that synchronizing dietary habits with our internal clocks can play a crucial role in preventing and managing chronic diseases, like diabetes.

== Physiological components ==
=== Gut microbiota ===
In studies involving mice, researchers have found that many gut bacterial species experience daily, diurnal fluctuations. These oscillations are influenced by factors like diet composition, light exposure, and are closely tied to feeding patterns, with certain bacterial populations peaking during feeding times and lessening during fasting periods. In addition, gut microbiota and circadian genes may have a bidirectional relationship. Mice with disrupted circadian genes have exhibited altered microbial rhythms, suggesting that a host subject's internal clock can influence the temporal organization of gut microbiota. Conversely, the absence of a healthy gut microbiome was shown to affect the expression of circadian genes in the host. Notably, it has also been found that altered feeding schedules disrupt the rhythmic patterns of gut microbiota, leading to metabolic imbalances. Understanding external factors that influence bacterial oscillations allows better understanding of metabolic disturbances. All of this underscores the importance of synchronizing light-dark cycles in maintaining gut microbial rhythms and, consequently, a healthy metabolism.

=== Glucose and insulin ===
Diurnal rhythms in hormone and blood-sugar levels have increased the interest in chrononutrition as a way to manage weight and T2D. Glucose, a simple carbohydrate that serves as the primary source of energy for all living organisms, is metabolized by the body to perform every physiological function. The efficiency of this metabolic process in humans, known as glucose tolerance, fluctuates on a circadian schedule, and complete glucose intolerance is a diagnostic marker of T2D. Melatonin, the "sleep hormone", has been a hallmark of circadian studies and exhibits an antiphase relationship with glucose tolerance, such that periods of increasing melatonin levels correspond to decreasing glucose tolerance. Later meals, characteristic of an evening chronotype and also a reported pattern in individuals with T2D, lead to postprandial hyperglycemia as the ability of the body to properly utilize glucose becomes more impaired.

The blood-glucose clock, or the specific timing of glucose metabolism within a 24-hour period, is partially controlled by the circadian rhythm of insulin sensitivity. Insulin, a hormone secreted by pancreatic β-cells, is responsible for the cellular absorption of glucose. Insulin sensitivity is a measure of how well the body absorbs glucose to produce energy, with insulin resistance the near complete inhibition of this pathway and a characteristic of prediabetes and T2D. It is a result of reduced signaling via the insulin receptor substrate, IRS1, and the insulin-sensitive glucose transporter, GLUT4, translocation. Expression of other clock genes, such as CLOCK and BMAL1, regulate the rhythmicity of these insulin and glucose-related genes, contributing to the mechanisms of the blood-glucose clock. Glucose tolerance and insulin sensitivity are in similar circadian phases of regulation, such that they both decrease in the evening and overnight. In the beginning of the active phase, insulin sensitivity begins to rise, with some peripheral clocks peaking in the late morning and some closer to noon. Larger caloric consumption during this part of the day rather than in the evening (bigger breakfast than dinner) allows the body to more efficiently absorb glucose for energy rather than fat storage. Restricting meal times to the active phase of the circadian cycle helps synchronize peripheral clocks to increase the overall robustness and maximize the usage of metabolic hormone oscillations.

== Food as a circadian time cue ==
=== Chronotype ===
A chronotype is the behavioral manifestation of an underlying circadian rhythm's variety of physical process manifestations. A person's chronotype is the propensity for the individual to sleep at a particular time during a 24-hour period. Morningness-eveningness refers to the individual differences in diurnal preferences, sleep-wake pattern for activity, and alertness in the morning and evening. There are three different classifications, including morning-type, intermediate-type, and evening-type. Research has revealed that these chronotypes have also exhibited genetic differences in allele frequencies, intrinsic period length, and phase angles of entrainment (melatonin rhythms and sleep–wake cycle timing). Differences in sleep-wake times can consequently influence mealtimes, which may affect the circadian timing system. A variety of studies have been conducted regarding the connections between these chronotypes and one's health. A significant relationship has been seen between chronotype and exhibiting healthy eating behavior, with poor eating habits and nutrition attitudes being seen in evening chronotypes. Furthermore, it has been shown that the evening chronotype was associated with specific unhealthy eating habits, including nighttime eating behavior and binge-eating behavior. Additionally, epidemiological studies have linked skipping breakfast or regularly eating late dinners with higher metabolic risk, though further research is needed to confirm causality. Meanwhile, limiting food intake to the normal active phase has been shown to increase the robustness of daily rhythms and reduce weight gain in rodent models.

=== Food entrainment ===
Food consumption is controlled by a balance between homeostatic drives and the circadian rhythm. Hormones such as leptin and ghrelin are important in the body's ability to regulate energy intake and expenditure. Hunger and satiation are regulated in a homeostatic manner in response to the body's energy status by various neural structures. The timing of food consumption is additionally coordinated by the brain to the circadian rhythm, which is the body's natural 24-hour oscillation in various biological outputs. Biological clocks, such as circadian clocks, may entrain to external inputs to stay synchronized to an environmental rhythm. Several circadian clocks work together to set food consumption during daily windows, typically aligned with the organism's active phase (daytime for diurnal animals such as humans, or nighttime for nocturnal animals). Clocks involved in the timing of feeding include the SCN (which acts as a master clock entrained to the light-dark cycle), as well as secondary clocks in the hypothalamus and brainstem which entrain to neural inputs from visceral organs, hormones, and circulating nutrients. Together, these clocks synchronize the brain and peripheral organs to feeding time. As a result, mistimed eating or chronodisruption may misalign the central clock (which remains entrained to light) and peripheral clocks (which shift with feeding) thereby causing metabolic disturbances. By contrast, restricting eating to the normal active phase supports clock alignment and helps maintain metabolic health. Long-term circadian disruption has been linked to conditions such as type 2 diabetes mellitus (T2D) and obesity.

== See also ==
- Intermittent fasting
- Chronobiology
- Nutritional immunology
- Nutritional neuroscience
