= Nutritional immunology =

Field of immunology

Nutritional immunology is a field of immunology that focuses on studying the influence of nutrition on the immune system and its protective functions. Indeed, every organism under nutrient-poor conditions will "fight" for the precious micronutrients and conceal them from invading pathogens. As such, bacteria, fungi, plants secrete for example iron chelators (siderophores) to acquire iron from their surrounding

Part of nutritional immunology involves studying the possible effects of diet on the prevention and management on developing autoimmune diseases, chronic diseases, allergy, cancer (diseases of affluence) and infectious diseases. Other related topics of nutritional immunology are: malnutrition, malabsorption and nutritional metabolic disorders including the determination of their immune products.

== Prevention and management of diseases ==
=== Autoimmune diseases ===
The development and progression of many autoimmune diseases are generally unknown. The "Western pattern diet" consists of high-fat, high-sugar, low-fiber meals with a surfeit of salt and highly processed food, which have pro-inflammatory effects. These effects may promote Th1- and Th17 - biased immunity and alter monocyte and neutrophil migration from bone marrow. A healthy diet contains a multitude of micronutrients that have anti-inflammatory and immune boosting effects that can help prevent or treat autoimmune diseases.

The impact of diet is studied in relation to these autoimmune diseases:

- Inflammatory bowel disease (IBD)
- Type 1 diabetes (T1D)
- Multiple sclerosis (MS)
- Systemic lupus erythematosus (SLE)
- Rheumatoid arthritis (RA)
- Celiac disease

=== Allergies ===
Nutrition can help prevent or promote the development of food allergies. The hygiene hypothesis states that a child's early introduction to certain microorganisms can avert the onset of allergies. Breastfeeding is considered to be the main method of preventing food allergies. This is because breast milk contains oligosaccharides, secretory IgA, vitamins, antioxidants and possible transfer of microbiota. Conversely, a child's lack of exposure to specific microorganisms can establish a vulnerability to food allergies

=== Diabetes ===
Diabetes mellitus is a disease in which one's blood sugar levels are elevated. There are two forms of diabetes: Type 1 diabetes and Type 2 diabetes. Type 1 is caused by the immune system attacking insulin-producing cells in the pancreas. Type 2 is caused by the underproduction of insulin and the cells in your body becoming resistant to insulin. A low-glycemic diet that is high in fiber is recommended for diabetics because low-glycemic foods digest slower in the body. Slower digestion helps stabilize blood glucose levels and prevents spikes in blood sugar.

=== Cancer ===
Cancer is a disease with multifactorial causes. Cigarette smoking, physical activity, viruses, and diet play a role in the development of cancer. Poor diet has been linked to the development of cancer, while a healthy diet has been shown to have positive effects on preventing and treating cancer. Cruciferous vegetables contain chemicals called Isothiocyanates (ITC's). ITC's have immune-boosting effects, as well as anti-cancer activity such as the prevention of angiogenesis. Angiogenesis is a process where tumors have their own blood supply in order to feed growing cancer cells. The alliinase containing food group, allium, has anti-cancer and anti-inflammatory properties. Alliinase is an enzyme, which acts as an angiogenisis-inhibitor and a carcinogen detoxifier. Mushrooms reduce cancer cell and tumor growth and prevent DNA damage. Mushrooms have aromatase inhibitors that decrease the levels of estrogen released in the bloodstream, slowing the production of breast tissue. Fruits and vegetables contain flavonoids, which are anti-carcinogens.

== Macronutrients ==
Macronutrients are a class of nutrients that the human body needs in larger amounts in order to function properly and the three main classes of macronutrients include: proteins, carbohydrates, and fats (lipids). The main role of macronutrients beside to make sure the body functions properly is to provide the body with energy in the form of calories.

=== Proteins ===
Proteins are large biomolecules made up of chains of amino acids, which are the organic compounds that make most bodily functions possible. Proteins are found naturally within the body and are found in foods such as meat, fish, dairy products, eggs, seeds and nuts, and beans and legumes. Throughout the body, proteins are found in hair, nails, muscles and bones, they also can function as enzymes and/or hormones. The role of proteins as enzymes and/or hormones is imperative for cell function and physiological processes as simple as growth. Proteins aid in muscle growth, speed up metabolism and lower blood pressure. Proteins are imperative for the body's tissues and organs, working in their function, structure and regulation. Protein's protect the immune system in the form of antibodies, y-shaped proteins that bind to viral, bacterial and parasitic infections, signaling to the rest of the body that there is a foreign cell that should be neutralized. Without antibodies, the body would not be able to target and fight infection.

=== Carbohydrates ===
Carbohydrates are sugars, starches and fibers found in grains, fruits, dairy products and vegetables. Carbohydrates are organic compounds made of Carbon, Hydrogen and Oxygen. They help the body's immunology by maintaining blood sugar, which reduces the body's stress response. It is common for people to consume carbohydrate rich foods before working out in order to maintain energy and avoid crash afterwards, this is a positive result of having maintained blood sugar. Carbohydrates are also an energy source for cells, act as cell receptors for recognition, and function in cell support.

=== Fats (lipids) ===
Lipids are macromolecules made up of hydrocarbons, there are 3 main types of lipids: triglycerides, phospholipids, and steroids. Lipids are hydrophobic molecules, therefore they are only soluble in non-polar solvents. Because of this, lipids do not break down in the body without the use of lipase enzymes, which break down lipids into glycerol and fatty acids. Lipids can be found in oils, dairy products, and some meats, along with in avocados and nuts. Cholesterol is a type of lipid and is an important feature in plasma membranes, which work in regulating immune cell plasticity. Lipids maintain the structure of cell membranes, act as storehouses of energy, maintain body temperature/ aid in homeostasis, are important signaling molecules. Without lipids, bodily cells would not be able to maintain function or survive. While consuming too many lipids can lead to obesity, high cholesterol, type 2 diabetes and other diseases, they are an important molecule to consume and maintain within the body. There are also vitamins that only dissolve in fats, such as vitamin A, K, D and E; these vitamins are vital in transporting and metabolizing fatty acids, transporting molecules across membranes and activating enzymes necessary for oxidative phosphorylation. Without lipids, cells in the body would not function and the body would simply fail. They are among the most important macromolecules.

==== Omega-3 fatty acids ====
Eicosapentaenioc acid (EPA) and docosahexaenoic acid (DHA) are omega-3 fatty acids, which can be found in marine fish, primarily in salmon, tuna, mackerel, herring and sardines and in fish oil. These two fatty acids are important components of cell membranes. It has been shown that they have anti-inflammatory effects in the body. EPA and DHA inhibit production of pro-inflammatory cytokines such as IL-1β, TNF-α, IL-6; they reduce the expression of adhesion molecules that are involved in inflammation and may modulate and reduce production of prostaglandins and leukotriens from the n-6 fatty acid arachidonic acid. These changes are most likely due to alterations in the lipid rafts on cell membranes, which then further affect signaling cascades and inhibition of activation of the pro-inflammatory transcriptional factor NF-κB. EPA and DHA can increase the production of anti-inflammatory cytokine IL-10 and promote production of protective mediators such as resolvins, protectins and maresins.

== Micronutrients ==
Micronutrients are a group of nutrients, usually in smaller amounts, that are vital for the human body to perform various physiological functions properly. This includes vitamins, minerals, phytochemicals, and antioxidants.

=== Vitamins and minerals ===
Vitamins and Minerals are essential substances that the body needs to grow and function. Your body needs thirteen vitamins, but does produce Vitamin K by the gut microflora and Vitamin D from the sunlight. A lack of vitamins and minerals such as iron will prime the immune system. Indeed, a lack of iron and vitamin A is associated with all cause-mortality and morbidity.

There are two types of vitamins, including fat-soluble vitamins and water-soluble vitamins. Fat-soluble vitamins are vitamins that are soluble in organic solvents, which include vitamins A, K, E, and D. Water-soluble vitamins are vitamins that are soluble in water and include vitamin C and B vitamins (thiamine, riboflavin, niacin, pantothenic acid, biotin, vitamin B-6, vitamin B-12, and folate. Most of the essential vitamins the body needs can be obtained by a balanced diet, with the exception of a portion of the population who don't get enough micronutrients from their diet or have a health condition that affects their nutritional needs. Similarly to vitamins, minerals are needed for your body to be healthy and to function properly. Minerals function to keep your bones, muscles, heart, and brain working correctly. Minerals also play a crucial role in the regulation and function of the immune system. In the adaptive immune system, the mineral zinc is an important structural element of the hormone thymulin, which is produced by the epithelial cells of the thymus and mediates the maturation of pre-T lymphocytes into T lymphocytes needed to protect the body from infection. Minerals include phosphorus, calcium, magnesium, sodium, potassium, chloride, and sulfur. There are also trace minerals needed in smaller amounts, which include iron, manganese, copper, iodine, zinc, cobalt, fluoride, and selenium.

=== Phytochemicals ===
Phytochemicals are chemical compounds found in plants. These phytochemicals are present in things like fruits, vegetables, whole grains, seeds, nuts, and legumes. They provide a multitude of health benefits ranging from small improvements such as, lowering blood pressure, reducing inflammation, and lowering LDL cholesterol levels in the blood to the major benefits of fighting against the growth of tumors, cancer, cardiovascular disease, along with being able to boost the immune system.

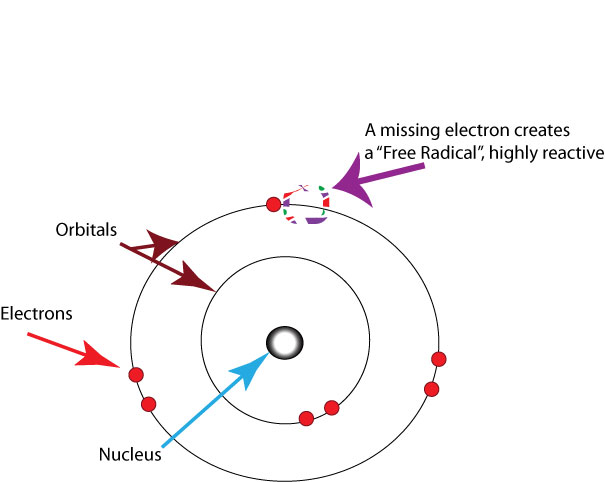
Free radical production

=== Antioxidants ===
Antioxidants are compounds that block unpaired electrons in a molecule or atom and keep it from becoming a free radical. Free radicals are molecules that are either naturally made in the human body after exercise or can be from exposure to environmental factors such as, cigarette smoke, pollution, and sunlight. These free radicals are destabilized and are highly reactive, which produces oxidative stress. This oxidative stress is what causes reactions that can damage cells in the body and can cause the cells to lose their function and become pathogenic.

=== Polyphenols ===
Polyphenols are organic substances that naturally occur in plants. They are important antioxidants with anti-inflammatory properties. It was demonstrated that curcumin can modulate immunity in many ways, mainly via regulation and inhibition of transcription factors such as nuclear factor NF-κB and activator protein 1 (AP-1). Another polyphenol, resveratrol, also modulates and promotes immune response.

== Prebiotics and Probiotics ==
Dietary prebiotics are a fermented ingredient that affect the composition and/or activity of the gut microbiome in a way that is beneficial to the host. Prebiotics involve mainly oligosaccharides and carbohydrates (fructooligosaccharides, galactooligosacharides, xylooligosaccharides, mannose oligosaccharides). These substances can modulate immune responses in the gut. Prebiotics regulate the growth of beneficial microbial organisms in the intestine (commensal bacteria).

Probiotics are live microorganisms that are beneficial to the host in sufficient amounts. Probiotics and their metabolites balance and modulate anti-inflammatory or pro-inflammatory immune responses in gut. Probiotics induce antimicrobial peptides such as β-defensin-2, they increase the production of T regulatory cells, and regulate cytokines and chemokines. They can also affect the polarization of the immune response (Th1 instead of Th2) and increase the production of IgA in the gut. The bacterial strains most commonly used as probiotics are Lactobacillus, Enterococcus, Bifidobacterium group

== See also ==
- Dietary inflammatory index
- Diet and cancer
- Chrononutrition
- Nutritional neuroscience
