= Jean Hay-Smith =

New Zealand professor of medicine

Academic background
- Education: University of Otago Faculty of Medicine, University of East London, Auckland University of Technology
- Thesis: Pelvic floor muscle training for female stress urinary incontinence (2003)

Academic work
- Institutions: University of Otago

Elizabeth Jean Carleton Hay-Smith is a New Zealand academic, and is a full professor at the University of Otago in Wellington, specialising in research on non-surgical treatments for pelvic organ prolapse and bladder problems.

== Academic career ==
Hay-Smith was born and brought up in Te Awaroa, and originally trained and worked as a physiotherapist before moving into academia. During her work as a physiotherapist at The London Hospital, obstetrician Wendy Savage began referring women experiencing dyspareunia (painful sex after childbirth) to her. Encouraged to pursue academia by obstetric physiotherapist Jill Mantle, Hay-Smith then studied dyspareunia for her master's degree. Returning to New Zealand, Hay-Smith completed a PhD titled Pelvic floor muscle training for female stress urinary incontinence at the University of Otago in 2003. Hay-Smith then joined the faculty of the University of Otago in Wellington, rising to associate professor in 2014 and full professor in 2020. Hay-Smith is an honorary associate professor at the University of Stirling. She is part of the Flourishing Together research project on health policy for disabled people.

Hay-Smith's research focuses on people with pelvic organ prolapse and bladder issues, such as incontinence. She uses clinical trials to investigate non-surgical treatments, and qualitative research to understand patient perspectives. She has also researched bladder management after stroke. Hay-Smith has contributed to Cochrane reviews on research to improve rehabilitation for bladder leakage and prolapse.

== Selected works ==
- Chantale Dumoulin; Licia P Cacciari; E Jean C Hay-Smith (2018). "Pelvic floor muscle training versus no treatment, or inactive control treatments, for urinary incontinence in women". Cochrane Database of Systematic Reviews. 10 CD005654. doi:10.1002/14651858.cd005654.pub4. PMID 30288727. Wikidata Q57026006.
- P Abrams; K E Andersson; L Birder; et al. (2010). "Fourth International Consultation on Incontinence Recommendations of the International Scientific Committee: Evaluation and treatment of urinary incontinence, pelvic organ prolapse, and fecal incontinence". Neurourology and Urodynamics. 29 (1): 213–240. doi:10.1002/nau.20870. PMID 20025020. Wikidata Q34089190.
- Woodley, Stephanie; Peter Lawrenson; Rhianon Boyle; June D Cody; Mørkved, Siv; Ashleigh Kernohan; E Jean C Hay-Smith (2020). "Pelvic floor muscle training for preventing and treating urinary and faecal incontinence in antenatal and postnatal women". Cochrane Database of Systematic Reviews. 5 CD007471. doi:10.1002/14651858.cd007471.pub4. PMC 7203602. PMID 32378735. Wikidata Q94602702.
- Ghulam Nabi; June D Cody; Gaye Ellis; Jean Hay-Smith; Herbison, Peter Graham (2006). "Anticholinergic drugs versus placebo for overactive bladder syndrome in adults". Cochrane Database of Systematic Reviews. doi:10.1002/14651858.cd003781.pub2. PMID 17054185. Wikidata Q24243870.
- Herbison, Peter Graham; Jean Hay-Smith; Gaye Ellis; Moore, Kate Hilda (2003). "Effectiveness of anticholinergic drugs compared with placebo in the treatment of overactive bladder: systematic review" (PDF). The BMJ. 326 (7394): 841–844. doi:10.1136/bmj.326.7394.841. PMC 153465. PMID 12702614. Wikidata Q34950386.
- L. C. Berghmans; H. J. Hendriks; K. Bo; E. J. Hay-Smith; R. A. de Bie; E. S. van Waalwijk van Doorn (1998). "Conservative treatment of stress urinary incontinence in women: a systematic review of randomized clinical trials". British Journal of Urology. 82 (2): 181–191. doi:10.1046/j.1464-410x.1998.00730.x. PMID 9722751. Wikidata Q77173600.
- Hay-Smith J; Herderschee R; Dumoulin C; Herbison P (2011). "Comparisons of approaches to pelvic floor muscle training for urinary incontinence in women". Cochrane Database of Systematic Reviews. 48 (4): 689–705. doi:10.1002/14651858.cd009508. PMID 22161451. Wikidata Q24234222.
