= Rosalind Gibson =

New Zealand nutrition academic

Rosalind Gibson FRSNZ
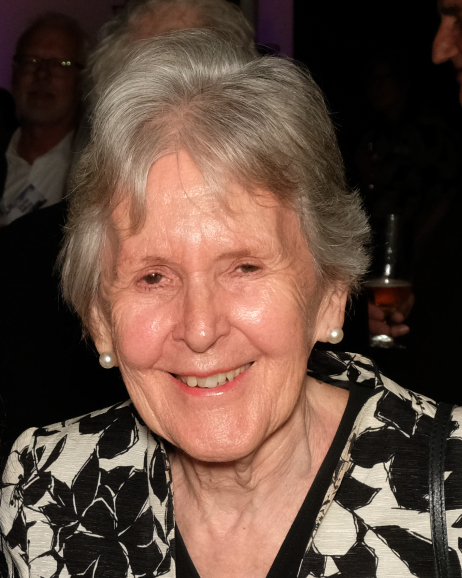
- Gibson in 2024
- Born: Rosalind Susan Alexander; 20 November 1940 (age 85); Corbridge, Northumberland, England
- Education: University of London
- Spouse: Ian Gibson (m. 1963)
- Children: 2
- Scientific career
- Fields: Micronutrients
- Workplaces: University of Otago
- Thesis: Use of hair as a biopsy material for the assessment of trace metal status in Canadian low birthweight infants (1979)

Rosalind Susan Gibson FRSNZ (née Alexander; born 20 November 1940) is a New Zealand nutrition academic. She is currently a professor emeritus and research professor at the University of Otago.

== Early life and family ==
Gibson was born Rosalind Susan Alexander in Corbridge, Northumberland, England, on 20 November 1940. in 1963, she married geologist Ian Gibson, and the couple went on to have two children, a son and a daughter. The son died as a result of a climbing accident; the daughter became a vet in New Zealand.

== Academic career ==
Gibson completed a Bachelor of Science degree in human nutrition at the University of London in 1962. She then graduated Master of Science from the University of California, with a thesis titled The inter-relationship of vitamins B_{6} and E. In 1979, she earned a PhD from the University of London, titled Use of hair as a biopsy material for the assessment of trace metal status in Canadian low birthweight infants.

Gibson worked as a research biochemist at the Institute of Orthopaedics at the University of London from 1962 to 1963. Between 1965 and 1968, she worked in Ethiopia as a nutritional biochemist at the Ethio-Swedish Children's Nutrition Unit in Addis Ababa. She then returned to Britain, as a lecturer in nutrition at Trinity and All Saints College from 1968 to 1971 and then at the Polytechnic of North London between 1971 and 1978. From 1977 to 1978, she was a research associate in nutrition at the Department of Pediatrics at Dalhousie University in Canada, before being appointed as a professor of applied human nutrition in the Department of Family Studies at the University of Guelph in 1979. She moved to the University of Otago in 1996, and was conferred the title of professor emeritus in 2015.

In 2002, Gibson was elected a Fellow of the Royal Society of New Zealand. She was awarded the 2013 Kellogg International Prize in Nutrition in recognition of her teaching work in Africa and Southeast Asia on nutrition, and for her research on micronutrient malnutrition.

== Selected works ==
- Gibson, Rosalind S. (2005). Principles of nutritional assessment. New York: Oxford University Press. ISBN 0195171691. This work, which had been in print for over 20 years, was recognised in her being awarded the Kellog International Prize in Nutrition.
- Gibson, Rosalind S. (1994). "Zinc nutrition in developing countries". Nutrition Research Reviews. 7 (1): 151–173. doi:10.1079/NRR19940010. PMID 19094296.
- Gibson, Rosalind S. (1994). "Content and bioavailability of trace elements in vegetarian diets". The American Journal of Clinical Nutrition. 59 (5): 1223S–1232S. doi:10.1093/ajcn/59.5.1223S. PMID 8172126.
- Hotz, Christine; Gibson, Rosalind S. (2007). "Traditional food-processing and preparation practices to enhance the bioavailability of micronutrients in plant-based diets". Journal of Nutrition. 137 (4): 1097–1100. doi:10.1093/jn/137.4.1097. PMID 17374686.
- Gibson, Rosalind S. (1993). Nutritional assessment: a laboratory manual. New York: Oxford University Press. ISBN 0195085477.
