= James Gross =

American psychologist

James J. Gross is an American psychologist. He is the Ernest R. Hilgard Professor of Psychology at Stanford University, where he directs the Stanford Center for Affective Science and the Stanford Psychophysiology Laboratory. Gross is best known for developing the process model of emotion regulation and is widely regarded as a foundational figure in the field of affective science.

== Education ==
Gross received his B.A. in philosophy from Yale University in 1987, where he was awarded the Alpheus Henry Snow Prize. He was a graduate visiting student at Oxford University from 1987 to 1988. He earned his Ph.D. in Clinical Psychology at the University of California, Berkeley in 1993 under the mentorship of Professor Robert W. Levenson. He received postdoctoral training from 1993-1994 at the University of California, San Francisco under the guidance of Ricardo Munoz.

== Career and research ==
Gross joined the Stanford faculty in 1994 and founded the Stanford Psychophysiology Laboratory, which focuses on the study of emotion and emotion regulation. The lab conducts research using behavioral, autonomic, and brain imaging methods to examine how people experience, express, and regulate emotion. It also serves as a teaching laboratory, training undergraduates, graduate students, postdoctoral researchers, and visiting scholars.

Gross has co-authored over 650 scientific publications, which have been cited over 250,000 times. He is the editor of the Handbook of Emotion Regulation, now in its third edition. Gross has contributed to the development of affective science as a field, including serving as the co-founding President of the Society for Affective Science and as the founding Co-Editor-in-Chief of the journal Affective Science.

Gross is best known for developing the process model of emotion regulation, a widely used framework. This model is based on the idea that emotions unfold over time through a sequence of steps: encountering a situation, paying attention to certain aspects of it, interpreting its meaning, and responding emotionally. Gross proposed that people can regulate their emotions by intervening at different points in this sequence.

The process model outlines five broad families of emotion regulation strategies:

1. Situation selection – choosing to approach or avoid situations based on their emotional impact
2. Situation modification – changing aspects of a situation to alter its emotional effect
3. Attentional deployment – shifting focus within a situation (e.g., distraction or concentration)
4. Cognitive change – reinterpreting the meaning of a situation (often called reappraisal)
5. Response modulation – directly influencing the emotional response itself (e.g., hiding feelings or calming down)

These strategies vary in their effectiveness depending on the context. For example, cognitive reappraisal (i.e., changing how one interprets a situation) is generally associated with better mental health outcomes, such as lower anxiety and greater well-being. However, its effectiveness depends on factors like timing, cognitive resources, and the controllability of the situation. Similarly, expressive suppression (i.e., inhibiting emotional expressions) has often been linked to negative social and physiological outcomes, but it may be adaptive in certain contexts. Rather than labeling strategies as inherently good or bad, the process model emphasizes flexibility, the ability to choose and adapt strategies based on situational demands and personal goals.

The model also includes four stages that guide how people regulate emotions:

1. Identification – recognizing whether an emotion needs to be regulated
2. Selection – choosing an appropriate strategy
3. Implementation – carrying out the chosen strategy
4. Monitoring – evaluating whether the strategy is working and adjusting if needed

This model has had widespread influence in the field of affective science, guiding research on emotional functioning across development, health, and psychopathology, and informing interventions in clinical, educational, and organizational settings.

== Awards and fellowships ==
Gross has been the recipient of numerous academic awards from psychological and educational associations:

- Alpheus Henry Snow Prize, Yale University, 1987.
- Vicki Jackson Prize, Yale University, 1987.
- Berkeley Graduate Fellowship, University of California, Berkeley, 1988–1991.
- Tursky Award, Society for Psychophysiological Research, 1991.
- Robert E. Harris Award, University of California, San Francisco, 1994.
- Dean's Award for Distinguished Teaching, Stanford University, 1996–1997.
- Fellow, American Psychological Society, 1997.
- Banks Faculty Fellow in the Social Sciences, Stanford University, 1997–1998.
- Early Career Award, Society for Psychophysiological Research, 2000.
- Early Career Award, American Psychological Association, 2001.
- Gordon and Dailey Pattee Faculty Fellowship, Stanford University, 2001–2002.
- Outstanding Young Researcher Award, Western Psychological Association, 2003.
- Bass University Fellow in Undergraduate Education, Stanford University, 2004–2009.
- Walter J. Gores Award for Excellence in Teaching, Stanford University, 2007.
- Postdoctoral Mentoring Award, Stanford University, 2008.
- Phi Beta Kappa Teaching Prize, 2009.
- Fellow, American Psychological Association, 2010.
- Postdoctoral Mentoring Award, Stanford University, 2012.
- Charles A. Lewis Prize, American Horticultural Therapy Association, 2015.
- Distinguished Scholar Award, Social and Affective Neuroscience Society, 2015.
- Brotherton Fellow, University of Melbourne, Australia, 2019.
- Ranked in Top 0.01% of Scientists in Terms of Impact, 2019–present.
- Honorary Doctoral Degree, Université Catholique de Louvain, Belgium, 2019.
- Named inaugural Ernest R. Hilgard Professor of Psychology, Stanford University, 2021.
- Fellow, American Association for the Advancement of Science, 2021.
- Inaugural Mentoring Award, Society for Affective Science, 2022.
- Fellow, American Academy of Arts and Sciences, 2022.
- Honorary Doctoral Degree, Tilburg University, Netherlands, 2022.
- Visiting Professor, Yale University, 2023.
- Fellow, Society of Experimental Psychologists, 2024.
- APS Mentor Award, Association for Psychological Science, 2024.
- Grawemeyer Award in Psychology, University of Louisville, 2025.
