= Muriel Bell =

New Zealand nutritionist and medical researcher (1898–1974)

- Born: 4 January 1898; Murchison, New Zealand
- Died: 2 May 1974 (aged 76); Dunedin, New Zealand
- Occupations: Nutritionist and medical researcher

Muriel Emma Bell CBE (4 January 1898 – 2 May 1974) was a New Zealand nutritionist and medical researcher. Bell campaigned for the value of vitamin C and D supplements for children which has subsequently benefited the health of all New Zealanders. Dr Bell also worked tirelessly on reducing the rate of goitre in New Zealand by introducing iodised salt.

== Early life ==
Bell was born in Murchison, New Zealand on 4 January 1898, the daughter of Thomas, a farmer, and Eliza (née Sheat). Bell attended the local school in Murchison. On the 3rd of May 1907, her mother was killed, and her father injured, in a tramcar accident in Wellington and her father consequently had to give up farming. He moved the family to Nelson and later became Mayor of Richmond.

== Education ==
Bell's father remarried in 1909, and Jessie McNee became Bell's stepmother. She encouraged Bell in her education, and Bell studied first at Nelson Girls' Central School, where she won a junior national scholarship, and then Nelson College for Girls, where she became Head Girl in 1915. In 1916 Bell won a Junior Scholarship to Victoria University of Wellington and began a B.A. degree. In 1917, she was urged by her brother and father to pursue a medical course, and transferred to Otago Medical School. While at university she was a member of the Christian Union, Bible Study Group, the Otago University Students Association (OUSA), and the Women's Faculty Association. In September 1920, under a revised OUSA constitution, Bell became the first 'Lady Vice-President'. She graduated from medical school in 1922. Following her graduation, she remained at the medical school as a junior assistant in the physiology department under John Malcom, who had a profound influence on Muriel's life as he had a special interest in metabolism and nutrition. In 1926, she was the first woman to be awarded an MD degree (Doctor of Medicine) by the University of Otago. Bell's thesis was on basal metabolism in goitre and contributed to the introduction of iodised salt, as her research showed that increasing the level of iodine in the diet was an effective protection against the illness

== Career ==
In 1922, Bell was appointed Assistant Lecturer in Physiology, and the following year became a Lecturer in Physiology, at Otago Medical School.

In 1929, Bell received the William Gibson Research Scholarship for Medical Women of the British Empire, which enabled her to study bush sickness in sheep with the newly formed DSIR (Department of Scientific and Industrial Research). She also became interested in soil deficiencies at this time. From 1930 to 1932 she researched vitamins at University College London and then stayed in England to work as a pathologist, including at Elizabeth Garrett Anderson Hospital.

In 1935, Bell returned to Dunedin and took a position lecturing physiology and experimental pharmacology at Otago Medical School. Two years later she became a founding member of the Medical Research Council, and served on its Nutrition Committee as both Research Officer and chairperson. She also served on the Board of Health, where she was the only woman board member.

In 1940, Bell was appointed the first Nutrition Officer in the Department of Health and held this position until retiring in 1964. She also held the position of Director of Nutrition Research at Otago Medical School for the same period of time. In these roles, she both conducted research and found effective ways to communicate the results to the public, such as through magazine and newspaper articles, radio broadcasts and the Plunket Society. During World War II she advised the New Zealand Red Cross on the vitamin value of food parcels sent to soldiers serving abroad, and immediately after the war she was responsible for writing guidelines and scales for food rationing. She also researched the vitamin content of New Zealand-grown vegetables, fruit, fish and cereals, and encouraged New Zealanders to eat more fruit and vegetables.

An early project for Bell was to supervise the joint publication of a textbook on nutrition by the Otago Medical School, the Department of Health and the Medical Research Council. The publication, "Good Nutrition: Principles and Menus" was a huge success and 40,000 copies were produced for nurses, doctors and the general public.

A particularly important goal for Bell was to ensure a safe and affordable supply of milk, and to encourage New Zealanders to drink milk as part of their daily diet. She was a founding member of the Central Milk Council, a watchdog body formed in 1945 to address problems in the industry which had been revealed in an inquiry the previous year. While on the council she worked to have milk pasteurized, delivered in covered trucks to protect it from sunlight, and to have unhealthy cows destroyed. With Dr Helen Deem of the Plunket Society she revised the guidelines for bottle-fed babies.

Another area of interest for Bell was the increase in dental caries. In 1950, Bell and her friend Dr Lucy Wills spend eight weeks in Fiji and Samoa to investigate nutritional reasons for tooth decay in the local populations there. Two years later she spent a sabbatical at Harvard University where she researched the effects of fluoridated water. As a result of her research, she returned to New Zealand to campaign for fluoridation. She was successful and from 1958 was a member of the Fluoridation Committee of the Department of Health.

After her retirement in 1964, Bell continued to take an interest in nutritional studies. She remained active on the Milk Council until her death, and when she died on 2 May 1974, she had been working on an article on the karaka berry.

== Personal life ==
Bell was married twice: first to James Saunders, from 1928 to his death in 1940; and secondly to Alfred Hefford, from 1942 to his death in 1957.

== Recognition ==
- 1938–1940 – Vice-president of the Dunedin Branch of the New Zealand Medical Women's Association
- 1940–1945 – President of the Dunedin Branch of the New Zealand Medical Women's Association
- 1941 – a Fellow of the New Zealand Institute of Chemistry
- 1952 – a Fellow of the Royal Society of New Zealand
- 1959 – a Fellow of the Royal Society of Medicine
- 1959 – a Fellow of the Royal Australasian College of Physicians
- 1959 – awarded Commander of the Order of the British Empire
- 1966 – honorary member of the New Zealand Nutrition Society
- 1968 – awarded an honorary doctorate by the University of Otago

The Nutrition Society of New Zealand holds an annual Muriel Bell Memorial Lecture.

== Legacy ==
In 2017, she was selected as one of the Royal Society of New Zealand's "150 women in 150 words". Bell's personal papers, stored at the Hocken Collections of the University of Otago, were inscribed on the UNESCO Memory of the World Aotearoa New Zealand Ngā Mahara o te Ao register in 2019.
