= Marlena Kruger =

Nutritional physiology researcher

Marlena Cathorina Kruger
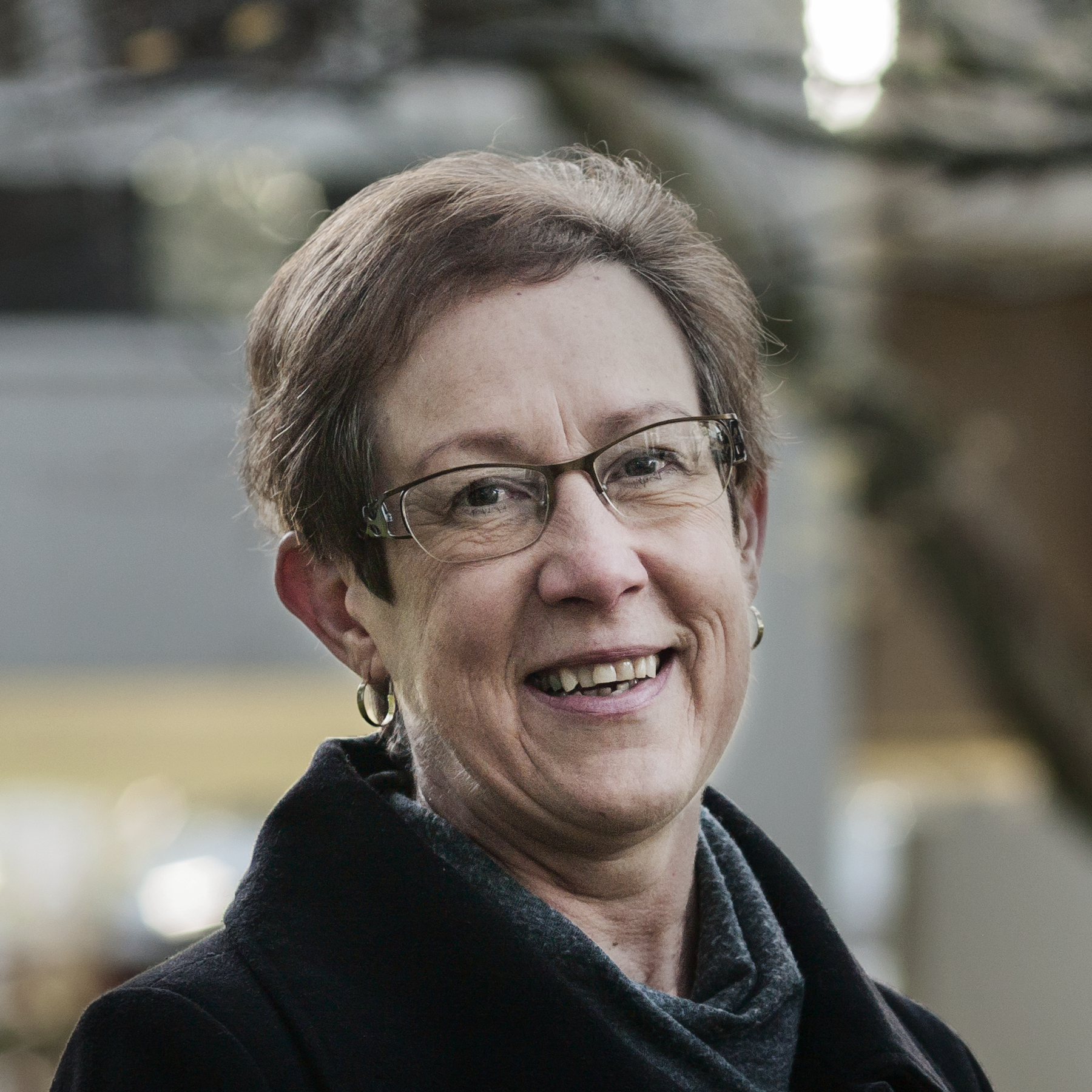
- Education: Medical University of Southern Africa
- Scientific career
- Fields: Human physiology
- Workplaces: University of Texas at Austin, University of Pretoria and Massey University
- Thesis: The effect of unsaturated fatty acids and related compounds on calcium transport in sarcoplasmic reticulum (1986)
- Doctoral students: Pamela von Hurst

Marlena Cathorina Kruger is a South African-New Zealand medical researcher and academic. She is currently a full professor of nutritional physiology at Massey University.

== Academic career ==
After completing her PhD in 1986, titled 'The effect of unsaturated fatty acids and related compounds on calcium transport in sarcoplasmic reticulum' at the Medical University of Southern Africa, Kruger held positions at the University of Texas at Austin and the University of Pretoria before joining Massey University in 2000, where she rose to full professor.

Kruger is an active member of Zonta International and was a finalist in the 2017 Westpac Women of Influence Awards. In 2021, she received Massey University's prestigious Supervisor Research Medal, the university's highest honor.

Notable doctoral students under her supervision include Pamela von Hurst.

== Selected works ==
- Kruger, M. C., H. Coetzer, R. De Winter, G. Gericke, and D. H. Van Papendorp. "Calcium, gamma-linolenic acid and eicosapentaenoic acid supplementation in senile osteoporosis." Aging Clinical and Experimental Research 10, no. 5 (1998): 385–394.
- Kruger, Marlena C., and David F. Horrobin. "Calcium metabolism, osteoporsis and essential fatty acids: A review." Progress in lipid research 36, no. 2-3 (1997): 131–151.
- Kruger, Marlena, John Wright, and Kuan Wang. "Nebulin as a length regulator of thin filaments of vertebrate skeletal muscles: correlation of thin filament length, nebulin size, and epitope profile." The Journal of Cell Biology 115, no. 1 (1991): 97–107.
- Kruger, Marlena C., Magdalena Coetzee, Marianne Haag, and H. Weiler. "Long-chain polyunsaturated fatty acids: selected mechanisms of action on bone." Progress in lipid research 49, no. 4 (2010): 438–449.
