= Rachael Taylor (academic) =

New Zealand childhood nutrition researcher

Rachael Taylor FRSNZ
- Born: 1971 (age 54–55)
- Education: University of Otago
- Scientific career
- Fields: Childhood nutrition
- Workplaces: University of Otago
- Thesis: Body composition in children and adolescents : a DXA based study (2001)

Rachael Waring Taylor FRSNZ (born 1971) is a New Zealand childhood nutrition academic. She is currently a full professor at the University of Otago.

== Academic career ==
After a 2001 PhD titled Body composition in children and adolescents : a DXA based study at the University of Otago, Taylor worked at Otago, rising to full professor in 2016.

Much of Taylor's research is related to infant and childhood obesity and has frequently made the news. In 2022, she was elected a Fellow of the Royal Society of New Zealand.

== Selected works ==
- Taylor, Rachael W., Ianthe E. Jones, Sheila M. Williams, and Ailsa Goulding. "Evaluation of waist circumference, waist-to-hip ratio, and the conicity index as screening tools for high trunk fat mass, as measured by dual-energy X-ray absorptiometry, in children aged 3–19 y–." The American Journal of Clinical Nutrition 72, no. 2 (2000): 490–495.
- Goulding, Ailsa, Ianthe E. Jones, Rachael W. Taylor, Sheila M. Williams, and Patrick J. Manning. "Bone mineral density and body composition in boys with distal forearm fractures: a dual-energy x-ray absorptiometry study." The Journal of Pediatrics 139, no. 4 (2001): 509–515.
- Taylor, Rachael W., Debbie Keil, Elspeth J. Gold, Sheila M. Williams, and Ailsa Goulding. "Body mass index, waist girth, and waist-to-hip ratio as indexes of total and regional adiposity in women: evaluation using receiver operating characteristic curves." The American Journal of Clinical Nutrition 67, no. 1 (1998): 44–49.
- Rockell, Jennifer E., Timothy J. Green, C. Murray Skeaff, Susan J. Whiting, Rachael W. Taylor, Sheila M. Williams, Winsome R. Parnell et al. "Season and ethnicity are determinants of serum 25-hydroxyvitamin D concentrations in New Zealand children aged 5–14 y." Journal of Nutrition 135, no. 11 (2005): 2602–2608.
- Taylor, Rachael W., Ianthe E. Jones, Sheila M. Williams, and Ailsa Goulding. "Body fat percentages measured by dual-energy X-ray absorptiometry corresponding to recently recommended body mass index cutoffs for overweight and obesity in children and adolescents aged 3–18 y." The American Journal of Clinical Nutrition 76, no. 6 (2002): 1416–1421.
