= Public Health Nutrition =

Peer-reviewed public health journal

- Discipline: Public health, nutrition science
- Language: English
- Edited by: Charlotte Evans

Publication details
- History: 1998-present
- Publisher: Cambridge University Press
- Frequency: Monthly
- Impact factor: 3.2 (2022)

Standard abbreviations
- ISO 4: Public Health Nutr.

Indexing
- ISSN: 1368-9800 (print); 1475-2727 (web)
- LCCN: sn98-39298

Links
- Journal homepage; Online archive

Public Health Nutrition is a monthly peer-reviewed public health journal covering nutrition-related public health topics. It was established in 1998 and is published by Cambridge University Press. The editor-in-chief is Charlotte Evans (University of Leeds). According to the Journal Citation Reports, the journal has a 2022 impact factor of 3.2.
