= Nutrition (journal) =

- Discipline: Nutrition science
- Language: English
- Edited by: Alessandro Laviano

Publication details
- Former name(s): Nutrition International
- History: 1985–present
- Publisher: Elsevier
- Frequency: Monthly
- Impact factor: 3.42 (2016)

Standard abbreviations
- ISO 4: Nutrition

Indexing
- CODEN: NUTRER
- ISSN: 0899-9007 (print); 1873-1244 (web)

Links
- Journal homepage; Online access; Online archive

Nutrition is a monthly peer-reviewed medical journal covering nutrition science. It was established in 1985 under the name Nutrition International, obtaining its current name in 1987. It is published by Elsevier and the editor-in-chief is Alessandro Laviano (Sapienza University of Rome).

== Abstracting and indexing ==
The journal is abstracted and indexed in:

- CINAHL
- Current Contents/Life Sciences
- MEDLINE
- Index Medicus
- EMBASE
- Food Science and Technology Abstracts
- Referativnyi Zhurnal (Russian Academy of Sciences)
- SCISEARCH
- CAB Abstracts
- Scopus

According to the Journal Citation Reports, the journal has a 2016 impact factor of 3.42.
