= The American Journal of Clinical Nutrition =

Academic journal

- Discipline: Nutrition and dietetics
- Language: English
- Edited by: Christopher P Duggan

Publication details
- Former name: Journal of Clinical Nutrition
- History: 1952–present
- Publisher: American Society for Nutrition (United States)
- Frequency: Monthly
- Impact factor: 7.045 (2021)

Standard abbreviations
- ISO 4: Am. J. Clin. Nutr.

Indexing
- CODEN: AJCNAC
- ISSN: 0002-9165 (print); 1938-3207 (web)
- LCCN: 56032466
- OCLC no.: 01480127

Links
- Journal homepage; Online access; Online archive

The American Journal of Clinical Nutrition (AJCN) is a monthly peer-reviewed biomedical journal in the fields of dietetics and clinical nutrition.

The journal was established in 1952 as the Journal of Clinical Nutrition, edited by S.O. Waife and published by the Nutrition Press. It was continued in series under the present title from 1954 and was published by the American Society for Clinical Nutrition, now known as the American Society for Nutrition. The journal's editor-in-chief is Christopher P Duggan of Harvard Medical School.

A poll conducted in 2009 by the Biomedical and Life Sciences Division of the Special Libraries Association identified the journal as among the "100 most influential journals ... over the last 100 years" in the fields of biology and medicine. According to the Journal Citation Reports, the journal has a 2021 impact factor of 7.045.

== Criticism and controversy ==
=== Conflicts of interest ===
Marion Nestle voiced concerns in November 2013 about conflict of interest by the AJCN board. Nestle stated that of the twelve-member editorial board "the majority — 7 of the 12 — list major corporate affiliations. The list of food companies for which they consult or advise ... includes Coca-Cola, PepsiCo, The Sugar Association, The National Restaurant Association, ConAgra, McDonald's, Kellogg, Mars, and many others."

Most of these, and various other major companies and corporations in the food industry, or their surrogates, are among those listed in the "Conflict of Interest Statements for The American Journal of Clinical Nutrition Editors," published by their affiliate, Oxford University Press.

The journal publicly lists the conflicts of interest of its editorial board on its website. In 2007, they published an article outlining their conflict of interest policy.

Nestle subsequently found widespread examples of apparent conflicts of interest resulting in apparently distorted studies published in various major journals of nutrition, including in the AJCN.

=== Criticism of content ===
In a February 2022 letter published in AJCN, seven co-authors of the Endocrine Society's 2017 scientific statement on the causes of obesity criticized a December 2021 AJCN article that they said had "several... statements" that were "misleading and factually incorrect," "mischaracterizing... the main thrust" of the Society's position that "views obesity as a complex disorder" -- instead falsely characterizing the Society's statement as simply asserting that obesity only depends upon "more calories [being] consumed than expended."

The letter's authors pointed to the AJCN's article as triggering false reporting in the media that "Overeating is not... the primary cause of obesity." The AJCN article was so quoted in media in science news, medical news, and business news publications and in popular media, in the United States and abroad.
