= Nutrients (journal) =

- Discipline: Food science, nutrition
- Language: English
- Edited by: Maria Luz Fernandez, Lluis Serra-Majem

Publication details
- History: 2009–present
- Publisher: MDPI
- Frequency: Semimonthly
- Open access: Yes
- Impact factor: 4.8 (2023)

Standard abbreviations
- ISO 4: Nutrients

Indexing
- CODEN: NUTRHU
- ISSN: 2072-6643
- OCLC no.: 608471106

Links
- Journal homepage

Nutrients is a peer-reviewed open-access scientific journal publishing reviews, regular research papers, and short communications on all aspects of nutrition. It was established in 2009 and is published by MDPI.

Until September 2018, the editor-in-chief was Jonathan Buckley of the University of South Australia. In 2018, Buckley and the other nine senior editorial board members resigned, claiming that MDPI "pressured them to accept manuscripts of mediocre quality and importance." The current editors-in-chief are Maria Luz Fernandez (University of Connecticut) and Lluis Serra-Majem (University of Las Palmas de Gran Canaria).

The journal is affiliated with the Asia Pacific Nutrigenomics Nutrigenetics Organisation, European Sport Nutrition Society, Italian Society for Pediatric Gastroenterology, Hepatology and Nutrition, Nutrition Society of New Zealand, Ocular Wellness & Nutrition Society, Società Italiana di Scienze dell’Alimentazione, Spanish Nutrition Society, and the Spanish Society of Community Nutrition.

== Abstracting and indexing ==
The journal is abstracted and indexed in:

- Biological Abstracts
- BIOSIS Previews
- CAB Abstracts
- Chemical Abstracts Service
- CINAHL
- EBSCO databases
- Embase
- Index Medicus/MEDLINE/PubMed
- ProQuest databases
- Science Citation Index Expanded
- Scopus

According to the Journal Citation Reports, the journal has a 2023 impact factor of 4.8.

== See also ==
- Australian paradox
