= Lidia Morawska =

Polish–Australian aerosol physicist (born 1952)

Lidia Morawska FAA
- Born: 10 November 1952 (age 73); Tarnów, Poland
- Education: Jagiellonian University
- Known for: research on air quality
- Awards: Prime Minister's Prize for Science (2025); L'Oréal-UNESCO For Women in Science Awards (2023); Matthew Flinders Medal and Lecture (2023); Fellow of the Australian Academy of Science (2020); Eureka Prize (2018); David Sinclair Award (2017)
- Scientific career
- Fields: radiation physics, environmental physics, atmospheric physics
- Workplaces: McMaster University; University of Toronto; Queensland University of Technology

Lidia Morawska (born 10 November 1952, Tarnów, Poland) is a Polish–Australian physicist, Australian Laureate Fellow and distinguished professor at the School of Earth and Atmospheric Sciences, at the Queensland University of Technology, director of the International Laboratory for Air Quality and Health (ILAQH) and ARC Training Centre for Advanced Building Systems Against Airborne Infection Transmission (Thrive) at QUT. She is past co-director of the Australia-China Centre for Air Quality Science and Management, an adjunct professor at the Jinan University in China, and a Vice-Chancellor fellow at the Global Centre for Clean Air Research (GCARE), University of Surrey in the United Kingdom. Her work focuses on fundamental and applied research in the interdisciplinary field of air quality and its impact on human health, with a specific focus on atmospheric fine, ultrafine and nanoparticles. Since 2003, she expanded her interests to include also particles from human respiration activities and airborne infection transmission.

In 2018, she received the Eureka Prize for Infectious Diseases Research, as well as the American Association for Aerosol Research (AAAR) 2017 David Sinclair Award. In 2020, she contributed to the area of airborne infection transmission of viruses, including COVID-19. In that same year she became a Fellow of the Australian Academy of Science (FAA) and received the QUT Distinguished Professorship, and received the 2021 International Society of Indoor Air Quality and Climate Special 2020 Award for an Extraordinary Academic Leadership. In 2021, she was included on Time magazine's list of the 100 most influential people in the world. In 2024, she was elected as an international honorary member of the American Academy of Arts and Sciences. In 2025, she was awarded the Prime Minister Prize for Science by the Prime Minister of Australia The Hon Anthony Albanese MP, received a Doctorate Honoris Causa from Lublin University of Technology, Poland for her global work in air quality research and its effects on human health and the environment, and was elected a fellow of the Australian Academy of Technological Sciences and Engineering.

== Life and career ==
She was born in 1952 in Tarnów to father Henryk Jaskuła, a yachtsman and sailing captain, and mother Zofia. At the age of two, she moved with her family to Przemyśl where she grew up. She studied physics and received her doctorate in 1982 at the Jagiellonian University, Kraków, Poland for research on radon and its progeny.

From 1982 to 1987, she was a research fellow at the Institute of Physics and Nuclear Techniques, Academy of Mining and Metallurgy, Cracow, Poland.

Prior to joining the Queensland University of Technology (QUT) in 1991, she conducted research first at McMaster University in Hamilton as a postdoctoral research fellow of the International Atomic Energy Agency, and later at the University of Toronto between 1987 and 1991.

She has conducted research in this field since 1991, when she established the Environmental Aerosol Laboratory at QUT, renamed the International Laboratory for Air Quality and Health in 2002. She subsequently assumed a position as associate professor at the QUT in 2003.

She is a long-standing collaborator and advisor to the World Health Organization, contributing to all WHO air quality-related guidelines over the past two decades. She co-chairs the group responsible for the WHO Air Quality Guidelines, on which nations base their air quality standards.

In addition, was an Associate Editor of Science of the Total Environment journal, (2007-2021).

== Research ==
Her research interests and scientific contributions fall into eight main areas: (i) Instrumental techniques for ultrafine particle detection in the air; (ii) Combustion as a source of urban atmospheric pollution; (iii) The science of ambient particle dynamics; (iv) Indoor Air Quality; (v) Lung Deposition; (vi) Risk assessment and mitigation; (vii) Developing and utilising advanced networks for air quality sensing and analyses; and (viii) particles from respiratory activities and infection control.

She has received funding from different sources and for different research projects including:

Funding for research projects
| Year | Project | Funding |
|---|---|---|
| 2023 | My Air Space: the Science of Buildings that Make us Thrive | ARC Laureate Fellowship |
| 2023 | ARC Training Centre for Advanced Building Systems Against Airborne Infection Transmission (Thrive) | ARC Industrial Transformation Training Centres |
| 2023 | Making Australia resilient to airborne infection transmission | ARC Linkage Projects |
| 2020 | The Air is Fair, Here and There": Queensland Communities Assessing and Comparing Air Quality | Queensland Citizen Science |
| 2019 | Overcoming cultural and developmental barriers to transition towards cleaner energy practices in Oceania: A pilot study in Solomon Islands | NHMRC CAR Seed Funding |
| 2019 | Airborne ultrafine particles in Australian cities | ARC Linkage Projects |
| 2018 | Assessment of children's exposure to air pollution in Fiji, its drivers and the burden of disease attributable to it | NHMRC CAR Seed Funding |
| 2017 | Establishing Advanced Networks for Air Quality Sensing and Analyses | ARC Linkage Projects |
| 2015 | Revolutionising protection against air pollution | ARC Discovery Projects |
| 2012 | Quantification of Airborne Engineered Nanoparticles: Developing a Scientific Framework to Inform their Regulation and Control | ARC Linkage Projects |
| 2011 | Detection, Characteristics and Dynamics of Airborne Engineered Nanoparticles for Human Exposure Assessment | ARC Discovery Projects |
| 2009 | Nanoparticles from urban transport: Quantification of formation and dynamics for application for health and environmental risk reduction | ARC Discovery Projects |
| 2009 | The Effects of Nano and Ultrafine Particles from Traffic Emissions on Children s Health (UPTECH) | ARC Linkage Projects |
| 2008 | A quantitative study into traffic generated nano and ultrafine particle dynamics and toxicity in transit hubs and transport corridors | ARC Linkage Projects |
| 2007 | Optimisation of indoor air quality, thermal comfort and energy usage within buildings located in busy transit-oriented developments | ARC Linkage Projects |
| 2007 | Quantification of Current and Future Traffic Emissions of Greenhouse Gasses and Particulate Matter for Application in Transport and Urban Planning | ARC Linkage Projects |
| 2005 | Quantification of interactions during the dispersion of corona ions and airborne particles near power lines | ARC Linkage Projects |
| 2005 | Development and validation of a model predicting charged aerosol characteristics in the proximity to high voltage powerlines | ARC Discovery Projects |
| 2005 | Mechanisms of virus transport in indoor environments | ARC Discovery Projects |
| 2004 | Developing Scientific Basis For The Rapid Detection System Of Diesel Vehicles With High Level Of Exhaust Emissions | ARC Linkage Projects |
| 2004 | Developing Scientific Basis for the Rapid Detection System of Diesel Vehicles with High Level of Exhaust Emissions | ARC Linkage Projects |
| 2003 | An integrated model of bus emission impacts at and around bus stations and busways for transport and land use planning | ARC Linkage Projects |
| 2002 | The effect of fuel type on health and environmental risks caused by motor vehicle emissions | ARC Discovery Projects |
| 2002 | Developing an air quality assessment model for application in human exposure assessment, housing/urban planning and policy setting | ARC Linkage Projects |

=== COVID-19 research ===
During the COVID-19 pandemic, she assembled and led a multidisciplinary group of 239 scientists guiding public health authorities worldwide to recognise the significance of airborne transmission of SARS-CoV-2 virus-laden particles and the risk it poses to human health. Based on this work, the WHO and other national authorities such as the US Center for Disease Control, subsequently updated their advice regarding airborne transmission. In 2020, she became a Member of the Task Force on Workplace, School, and Travel Safety, The Lancet COVID Commission, looking into building-related risk factors which are a critical, but missing, component of SARS-CoV-2 outbreak investigations.

=== Ultrafine particle research ===
Her "Ultrafine Particles from Traffic Emissions and Children's Health" project demonstrated that exposure to airborne ultrafine particles emitted in large quantities from vehicles was independently, positively associated with both systemic and respiratory inflammation and therefore has significant deleterious health impacts. In 2015, this evidence convinced the World Health Organization and individual countries to review national standards to protect children by controlling their exposure to ultrafine particles. As a result, they changed their air quality guidelines to include recommendations regarding ultrafine particles. In 2019, she led the "Thinking outside the box" team which prepared a White Paper titled "Ambient ultrafine particles: evidence for policy makers”, and in 2021, had input into the good practices for the management of ultrafine particles in the new WHO Global Air Quality Guidelines.

=== Global Burden of Diseases studies ===
Since 2012, she has also contributed work on international scientific programs, such as the Global Burden of Disease studies which quantitatively assess the impact of exposure to air pollution as a disease risk.

== Honours and awards ==
Her scientific career has been recognised and awarded in multiple occasions by various organisations, among those are:

- 2026: Ranked #4 in Australia, and #75 in the world in Research.com ’s Best Environmental Sciences Scientists
- 2025: Prime Minister's Prize for Science
- 2025: Doctorate Honoris Causa from Lublin University of Technology, Poland
- 2025: President’s Prize, Australian Institute of Architects
- 2024: Planetary Health Award, The Prince Albert II of Monaco Foundation
- 2024: Forbes Polish Women Magazine list of 50 women over 50
- 2024: named in the ABC The Science Show’s Top 100 Australian Scientists .
- 2023: L'Oréal-UNESCO For Women in Science Awards (Laureate for Asia and the Pacific – Earth and environmental science)
- 2023: Matthew Flinders Medal and Lecture awarded by the Australian Academy of Science
- 2023: Lung Health Legends Award, Lung Foundation Australia
- 2022: American Association for Aerosol Research (AAAR) Susanne V. Herring Award
- 2021: Time magazine's list of the 100 most influential people in the Innovators category
- 2021: ISIAQ Special 2020 Award for an Extraordinary Academic Leadership, International Society of Indoor Air Quality and Climate
- 2021: Honorary Fellow, Clean Air Society of Australia and New Zealand
- 2021: Researcher of the Year, Faculty of Science 2021 Dean’s Outstanding Achievement Award, QUT
- 2020: QUT Vice-Chancellors' Award for Leadership Excellence, QUT Recognition Program
- 2020: Ranked 16,428 in the list of the 100,000 best scientists in the world according to the Stanford University
- 2020: Recognition by The Sydney Morning Herald as one of the best scientists in the area of health and science
- 2020: Nominee in the list of the Top 40 Australian scientists by the Australian Research Magazine
- 2020: Fellow of the Australian Academy of Science
- 2018: Eureka Prize for Infectious Diseases Research by the Australian Museum of Eureka Prizes
- 2017: David Sinclair Award by the American Association for Aerosol Research
- 2017: Queensland University of Technology Vice-Chancellor's Performance Award
- 2011: Clean Air Medal by the Clean Air Society of Australia and New Zealand

== Selected works ==
She is credited with more than 950 academic publications, including scientific articles, book chapters, and conference papers. Among the most cited publications are:

- Stephen S Lim; Vos, Eric Theo; Flaxman, Abraham; et al. (2012). "A comparative risk assessment of burden of disease and injury attributable to 67 risk factors and risk factor clusters in 21 regions, 1990-2010: a systematic analysis for the Global Burden of Disease Study 2010". The Lancet. 380 (9859): 2224–2260. doi:10.1016/s0140-6736(12)61766-8. PMC 4156511. PMID 23245609. Wikidata Q27860879.
- Murray, Christopher; Lozano, Rafael; Mohsen Naghavi; et al. (2012). "Disability-adjusted life years (DALYs) for 291 diseases and injuries in 21 regions, 1990-2010: a systematic analysis for the Global Burden of Disease Study 2010". The Lancet. 380 (9859): 2197–223. doi:10.1016/s0140-6736(12)61689-4. PMID 23245608. Wikidata Q27860791.
- Vos, Eric Theo; Flaxman, Abraham; Mohsen Naghavi; et al. (2012). "Years lived with disability (YLDs) for 1160 sequelae of 289 diseases and injuries 1990–2010: a systematic analysis for the Global Burden of Disease Study 2010". The Lancet. 380 (9859): 2163–2196. doi:10.1016/s0140-6736(12)61729-2. PMC 6350784. PMID 23245607. Wikidata Q28111913.
- Mohammad H Forouzanfar; Ashkan Afshin; Lily T Alexander; et al. (2016). "Global, regional, and national comparative risk assessment of 79 behavioural, environmental and occupational, and metabolic risks or clusters of risks, 1990-2015: a systematic analysis for the Global Burden of Disease Study 2015". The Lancet. 388 (10053): 1659–1724. doi:10.1016/s0140-6736(16)31679-8. PMC 5388856. PMID 27733284. S2CID 13770184. Wikidata Q30353195.
- GBD 2013 Risk Factors Collaborators; Mohammad H Forouzanfar; Alexander, Lily; et al. (2015). "Global, regional, and national comparative risk assessment of 79 behavioural, environmental and occupational, and metabolic risks or clusters of risks in 188 countries, 1990-2013: a systematic analysis for the Global Burden of Disease Study 2013". The Lancet. 386 (10010): 2287–2323. doi:10.1016/s0140-6736(15)00128-2. PMC 4685753. PMID 26364544. Wikidata Q30358426.

Selected publications on Covid-19:

- Lidia Morawska, et al., “ Mandating indoor air quality for public buildings ”. Science, 383(6690): 1418–1420, 2024
- Lidia Morawska, et al., "A paradigm shift to combat indoor respiratory infection". Science, 372(6543): 689–691, 2021.
- Lidia Morawska and Donald Milton, "It is Time to Address Airborne Transmission of COVID-19". Clinical Infectious Diseases, 71(9): 2311-2313, 2020.
- Lidia Morawska, et al., Morawska et al., "How can airborne transmission of COVID-19 indoors be minimised?" Environ. Int., 142:105832, 2020.
- Morawska, Lidia; Junji Cao (2020). "Airborne transmission of SARS-CoV-2: The world should face the reality". Environment International. 139 105730. doi:10.1016/j.envint.2020.105730. PMC 7151430. PMID 32294574. Wikidata Q91958993.
- Lian Zhou; Maosheng Yao; Xiang Zhang; et al. (2020). "Breath-, air- and surface-borne SARS-CoV-2 in hospitals". Journal of Aerosol Science 105693. doi:10.1016/j.jaerosci.2020.105693. PMC 7557302. PMID 33078030. Wikidata Q100737401.
- Miller, Shelly; Nazaroff, William; Jimenez, Jose; Atze Boerstra; Giorgio Buonanno; Stephanie J Dancer; Kurnicki, Jarek; Marr, Linsey; Morawska, Lidia; Noakes, Catherine (2020). "Transmission of SARS-CoV-2 by inhalation of respiratory aerosol in the Skagit Valley Chorale superspreading event". Indoor Air. 31 (2): 314–323. doi:10.1111/ina.12751. PMC 7537089. PMID 32979298. Wikidata Q99730713.

== See also ==
- List of Polish physicists
