= Rebecca Grainger =

Rheumatologist in New Zealand

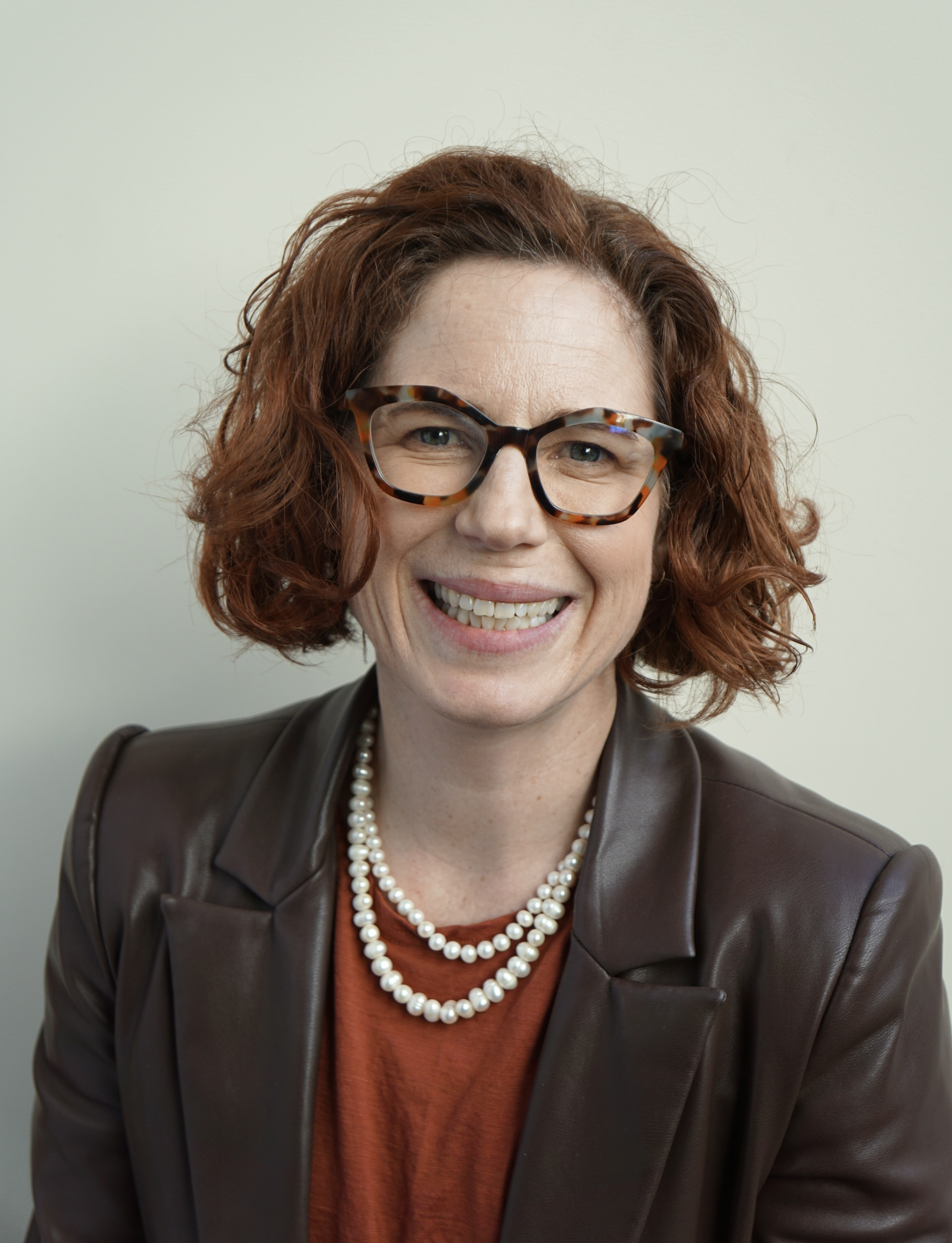

Academic background
- Education: University of Otago
- Theses: B cells as antigen-presenting cells (1994); Systemic soluble and cellular mediators of gouty arthritis: a comparative observational study (2009)

Academic work
- Institutions: University of Otago

Rebecca Grainger is a New Zealand academic rheumatologist, and is a full professor at the University of Otago, specialising in rheumatoid arthritis and osteoarthritis, and gout. She is also interested in the use of technology for medical education and digital health.

== Academic career ==
Grainger completed a Bachelor of Medicine and a PhD titled Systemic soluble and cellular mediators of gouty arthritis: a comparative observational study at the University of Otago, based in the Malaghan Institute. She received further rheumatology training in Melbourne. Grainger practised as a rheumatologist, and joined the faculty of the University of Otago in Wellington 2008, rising to full professor in 2022. She is a consultant rheumatologist at Hutt District Health Board.

Grainger's research focuses on arthritis and other inflammatory conditions, but she is also interested in digital health and medical education using technology. She is on the steering committee of the COVID-19 Global Rheumatology Alliance, which delivers accurate and evidence-based information for rheumatology providers and patients. Grainger has held leadership roles in Arthritis New Zealand (2014–2018), the New Zealand Rheumatology Association, the Royal Australasian College of Physicians, and the American College of Rheumatology. She has been a member of the Research Advisory Committee for Research for Life, also known as the Wellington Medical Research Foundation, since 2012, and was appointed chair in 2018. Grainger has been an associate editor of Focus on Health Professional Education since 2023.

== Honours and awards ==
Grainger was elected a Fellow of the International Academy of Health Sciences Informatics in 2018/19, and as a Fellow of Health Informatics New Zealand in 2021.

== Selected works ==
- Lim, Stephen; Vos, Eric Theo; Flaxman, Abraham; et al. (2012). "A comparative risk assessment of burden of disease and injury attributable to 67 risk factors and risk factor clusters in 21 regions, 1990-2010: a systematic analysis for the Global Burden of Disease Study 2010". The Lancet. 380 (9859): 2224–2260. doi:10.1016/s0140-6736(12)61766-8. PMC 4156511. PMID 23245609. Wikidata Q27860879.
- Murray, Christopher; Lozano, Rafael; Naghavi, Mohsen; et al. (2012). "Disability-adjusted life years (DALYs) for 291 diseases and injuries in 21 regions, 1990-2010: a systematic analysis for the Global Burden of Disease Study 2010". The Lancet. 380 (9859): 2197–223. doi:10.1016/s0140-6736(12)61689-4. PMID 23245608. Wikidata Q27860791.
- Vos, Eric Theo; Flaxman, Abraham; Naghavi, Mohsen; et al. (2012). "Years lived with disability (YLDs) for 1160 sequelae of 289 diseases and injuries 1990–2010: a systematic analysis for the Global Burden of Disease Study 2010". The Lancet. 380 (9859): 2163–2196. doi:10.1016/s0140-6736(12)61729-2. PMC 6350784. PMID 23245607. Wikidata Q28111913.
- Gianfrancesco, Milena; Kimme L Hyrich; Sarah Al-Adely; et al. (2020). "Characteristics associated with hospitalisation for COVID-19 in people with rheumatic disease: data from the COVID-19 Global Rheumatology Alliance physician-reported registry". Annals of the Rheumatic Diseases. 79 (7): 859–866. doi:10.1136/annrheumdis-2020-217871. PMC 7299648. PMID 32471903. Wikidata Q96022237.
- Qian Liu; Geertshuis, Susan; Grainger, Rebecca (2020). "Understanding academics' adoption of learning technologies: A systematic review". Computers and Education. 151 103857. doi:10.1016/j.compedu.2020.103857. Wikidata Q125251070.
- Grainger, Rebecca; Hermaleigh Townsley; White, Bonnie; Langlotz, Tobias; Taylor, William John (2017). "Apps for People With Rheumatoid Arthritis to Monitor Their Disease Activity: A Review of Apps for Best Practice and Quality". JMIR mHealth and uHealth. 5 (2): e7. doi:10.2196/mhealth.6956. PMC 5340922. PMID 28223263. Wikidata Q33452891.
- Grainger, Rebecca; Alfred H J Kim; Richard Conway; Jinoos Yazdany; Robinson, Philip (2022). "COVID-19 in people with rheumatic diseases: risks, outcomes, treatment considerations". Nature Reviews Rheumatology. 18 (4): 191–204. doi:10.1038/s41584-022-00755-x. PMC 8874732. PMID 35217850. Wikidata Q125185556.
