= Shelly Miller =

American engineer and academic

Shelly Lynn Miller
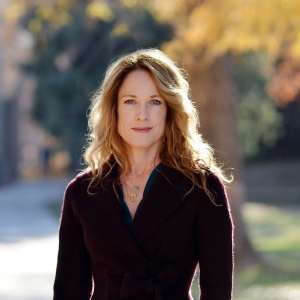
- Miller for 2020 NIST workshop
- Born: Southern California
- Education: Harvey Mudd College; University of California, Berkeley
- Scientific career
- Workplaces: University of Colorado Boulder
- Thesis: Characterization and control of exposure to indoor air pollutants generated by occupants (1996)
- Website: www.colorado.edu/even/people/shelly-miller

Shelly Lynn Miller is an American mechanical engineer who is a professor at the University of Colorado Boulder. Her research investigates indoor air quality and urban air pollution. During the COVID-19 pandemic, Miller studied the spread of COVID-19 and how to minimize the spread of coronavirus.

== Early life and education ==
Miller grew up in Southern California. She has said during her childhood there were days when smog prevented her attending school due to poor air quality. She studied applied mathematics at Harvey Mudd College, then moved to the University of California, Berkeley for her graduate degrees, where she specialized in civil and environmental engineering. Her doctoral research considered the characterization of indoor air pollutants generated by people inside buildings.

== Research and career ==
Miller moved to the University of Colorado Boulder, where she was made a Chancellor's Postdoctoral Fellow and she studied air quality in schools and in communities. She used citizen science and monitoring stations to collect data on air quality in various environments, work which was awarded an Environmental Achievement Award from the United States Environmental Protection Agency. Her research investigated indoor air quality and urban air pollution. She has studied how filtration and germicidal irradiation impact indoor air quality, and how to optimize the design of such systems to maximize the benefits to human health. She has developed characterization techniques to understand indoor environmental quality inside homes and how heating, ventilation, and air conditioning (HVAC) impacts the transmission of infectious diseases.

During the COVID-19 pandemic, Miller researched the spread of coronavirus. In particular, she looked to understand ways to reduce transmission with ventilation and filtration. She designed new HVAC systems to reduce airborne transmission. She was awarded the Robert L. Stearns Alumni Award for her leadership during the pandemic. Miller used this experience to call for better indoor air quality. She was awarded the 2022 Distinguished Research Lectureship.

== Selected publications ==
- Lidia Morawska; Julian W Tang; William Bahnfleth; et al. (27 May 2020). "How can airborne transmission of COVID-19 indoors be minimised?". Environment International. 142 105832. doi:10.1016/J.ENVINT.2020.105832. ISSN 0160-4120. PMC 7250761. PMID 32521345.
- Shelly Miller; William W. Nazaroff; Jose L. Jimenez; et al. (26 September 2020). "Transmission of SARS-CoV-2 by inhalation of respiratory aerosol in the Skagit Valley Chorale superspreading event". Indoor Air. 31 (2): 314–323. doi:10.1111/INA.12751. ISSN 0905-6947. PMC 7537089. PMID 32979298.
- Albert Barberán; Robert Dunn; Brian J Reich; et al. (7 September 2015). "The ecology of microscopic life in household dust". Proceedings of the Royal Society B. 282 (1814) 20151139. doi:10.1098/RSPB.2015.1139. ISSN 0962-8452. PMC 4571696. PMID 26311665.
