= Rita Krishnamurthi =

Epidemiologist in New Zealand

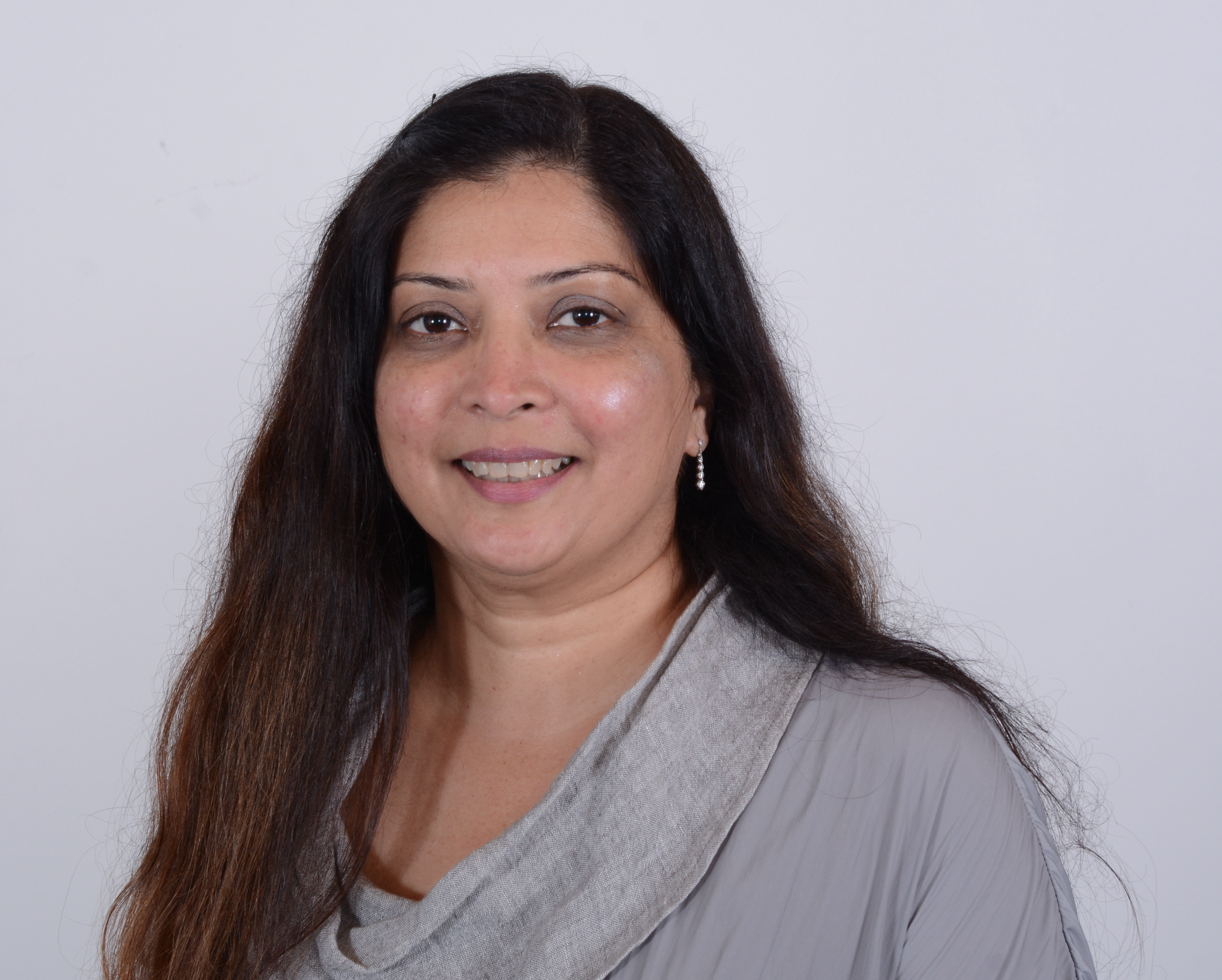
- Krishnamurthi in 2022

Academic background
- Education: University of Technology Sydney, University of Auckland
- Thesis: Treatment Effects of the N-terminal tripeptide of insulin-like growth factor-1, GPE, in a Rat Model of Parkinson's Disease (2006)
- Doctoral advisor: Richard Faull, Di McCarthy

Rita V. Krishnamurthi is a New Zealand academic, and since 2023 is a full professor at the Auckland University of Technology, specialising in the epidemiology of stroke and dementia.

== Academic career ==
Krishnamurthi completed a PhD titled Treatment Effects of the N-terminal tripeptide of insulin-like growth factor-1, GPE, in a Rat Model of Parkinson’s Disease at the University of Auckland in 2006. Krishnamurthi then moved to Auckland University of Technology, rising to full professor in 2023. Her research covers the epidemiology and prevention of stroke and dementia. She is deputy director of the National Institute for Stroke and Applied Neurosciences.

Krishnamurthi participates in a number of large international studies. She is a member of the stroke expert panel in the Global Burden of Disease Study, and is part of the PRIME International Study and the Personalized Knowledge to Reduce Stroke Risk study.

== Awards and honours ==
In 2021 Krishnamurthi was a World Stroke Organization "Women in Stroke" nominee, an initiative aimed at highlighting "outstanding women working in stroke medicine, stroke research and stroke advocacy".

Krishnamurthi was a co-investigator in the National Institute for Stroke and Applied Neurosciences, led by Valery Feigin, that won the Te Pūiaki Putaiao Matua a te Pirimia Science Prize in the 2022 Prime Minister's Science Prizes. The $500,000 prize is awarded to "an individual or team for a transformative scientific discovery or achievement, which has had a significant economic, health, social and/or environmental impact on New Zealand and/or internationally".

== Selected works ==
- Lozano, Rafael; Naghavi, Mohsen; Foreman, Kyle; et al. (2012). "Global and regional mortality from 235 causes of death for 20 age groups in 1990 and 2010: a systematic analysis for the Global Burden of Disease Study 2010". The Lancet. 380 (9859): 2095-2128, 2095-128. doi:10.1016/s0140-6736(12)61728-0. PMID 23245604. Wikidata Q21534928.
- Murray, Christopher; Lozano, Rafael; Mohsen Naghavi; et al. (2012). "Disability-adjusted life years (DALYs) for 291 diseases and injuries in 21 regions, 1990-2010: a systematic analysis for the Global Burden of Disease Study 2010". The Lancet. 380 (9859): 2197–223. doi:10.1016/s0140-6736(12)61689-4. PMID 23245608. Wikidata Q27860791.
- Vos, Eric Theo; Flaxman, Abraham; Mohsen Naghavi; et al. (2012). "Years lived with disability (YLDs) for 1160 sequelae of 289 diseases and injuries 1990–2010: a systematic analysis for the Global Burden of Disease Study 2010". The Lancet. 380 (9859): 2163–2196. doi:10.1016/s0140-6736(12)61729-2. PMC 6350784. PMID 23245607. Wikidata Q28111913.
- Rita V. Krishnamurthi; Valery L. Feigin; Mohammad H Forouzanfar; et al. (2013). "Global and regional burden of first-ever ischaemic and haemorrhagic stroke during 1990-2010: findings from the Global Burden of Disease Study 2010". The Lancet Global Health. 1 (5): e259-81. doi:10.1016/s2214-109x(13)70089-5. PMC 4181351. PMID 25104492. Wikidata Q34272892.
- Feigin, Valery L.; Gregory A Roth; Mohsen Naghavi; et al. (2016). "Global burden of stroke and risk factors in 188 countries, during 1990-2013: a systematic analysis for the Global Burden of Disease Study 2013". The Lancet Neurology. 15 (9): 913–924. doi:10.1016/s1474-4422(16)30073-4. PMID 27291521. Wikidata Q39690277.
