= Dianne Sika-Paotonu =

New Zealand immunologist

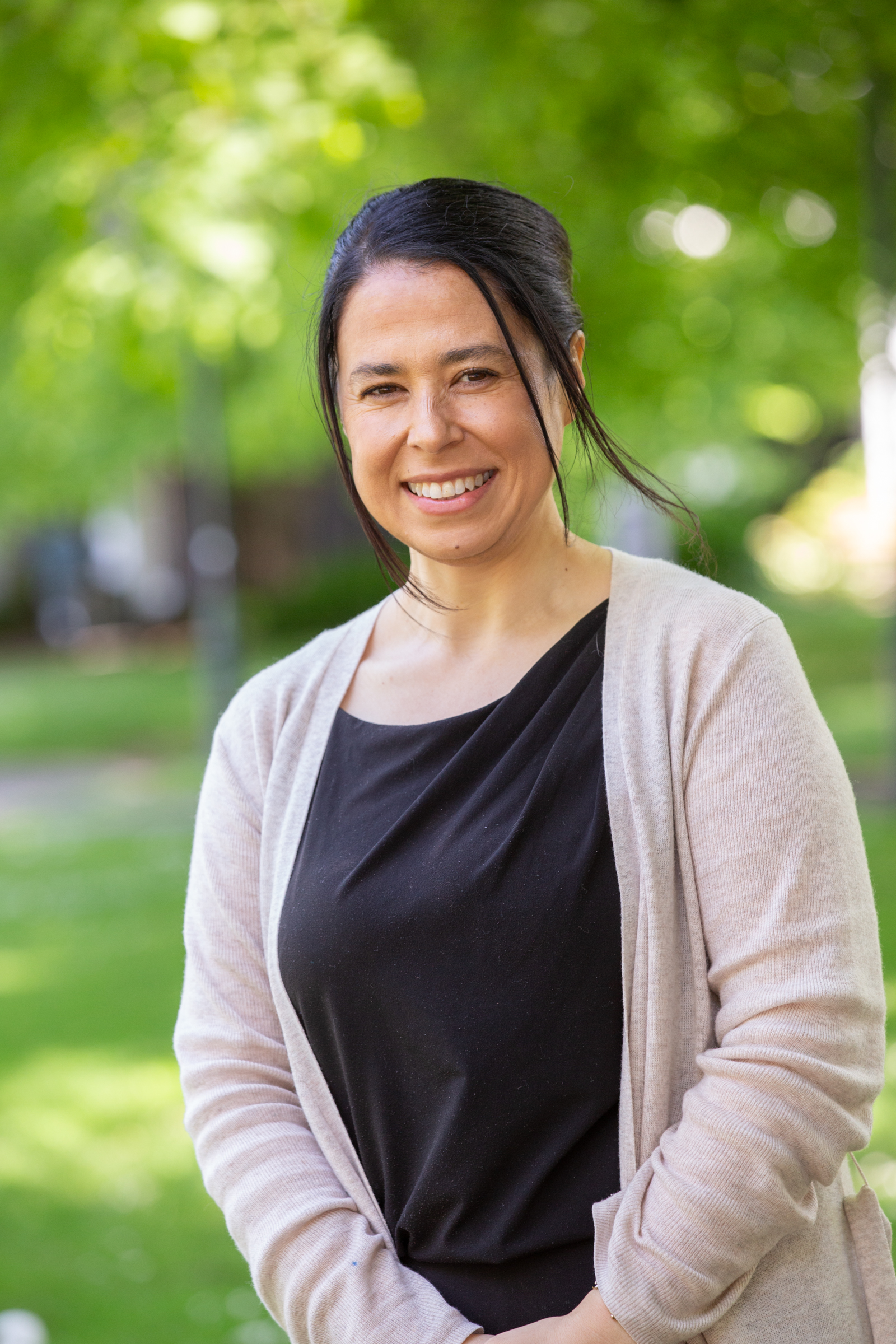
- Born: New Zealand
- Education: Victoria University of Wellington
- Occupation: Immunologist
- Scientific career
- Thesis: Increasing the potency of dendritic cell based vaccines for the treatment of cancer (2014)
- Doctoral advisor: Franca Ronchese, Ian F Hermans

Dianne Sika-Paotonu is a New Zealand immunologist, biomedical scientist and academic in the Department of Pathology and Molecular Medicine and Associate Dean (Pacific) at the University of Otago Wellington. She is of Tongan descent and is the first Pasifika biomedical scientist to receive the Cranwell Medal for science communication in 2020 and the 2022 Prime Minister's Science Communicator of the Year prize. In 2024 Sika-Paotonu was awarded the Callaghan Medal by the Royal Society Te Apārangi.

== Early life and education ==
Sika-Paotonu was born in New Zealand to Tongan parents who emigrated to New Zealand from Tonga in the 1960s. She has one brother. She attended Cannons Creek Primary School, the Wellington Seventh Day Adventist school and Wellington Girls' College. She studied at Victoria University of Wellington where she gained a BSc in physiology in 2001, a Bachelor of Biomedical Science in molecular pathology in 2003, a Masters in Biomedical Science in 2007 and a PhD. Her PhD thesis, completed in 2014, was titled Increasing the potency of dendritic cell based vaccines for the treatment of cancer.

== Career ==
Sika-Paotonu completed her PhD while working on cancer vaccines at the Malaghan Institute of Medical Research in Wellington. From her work on vaccines she moved into investigating cancer diagnosis and the early detection of cancer. She has been researching the treatment of rheumatic fever, in particular long–lasting penicillin and is the scientific lead of the Rheumatic Fever and Penicillin Research Programme. She has raised issues of concern about missed diagnoses of rheumatic fever during the COVID-19 pandemic.

Her research into the early detection of cancer using a blood test was funded by a Sir Thomas Davis Te Patu Kite Rangi Ariki Fellowship in 2018. In 2020 she received a Fulbright Scholarship to travel to Harvard University and the University of Oklahoma to research rheumatic fever, rheumatic heart disease and early detection of cancer.

Her work extends into health equity issues for Pasifika and Māori communities and mentoring Pasifika students and researchers.

Sika-Paotonu is a senior lecturer in the Department of Pathology and Molecular Medicine and Associate Dean (Pacific) at the University of Otago, Wellington. She is a Health Research Council Pacific Emerging Research Fellow.

== Honours and awards ==
- MacDiarmid Award (2008)
- NZ Young Scientist Award for advancing Human Health and Wellbeing (medical category) (2008)
- Colmar Brunton NZ Research Excellence Award (2008)
- Australasian Society of Immunology (ASI) Science Communication Award (2008)
- Health Research Council of New Zealand's Sir Thomas Davis Te Patu Kite Rangi Ariki Health Research Fellowship (2018)
- New Zealand Association of Scientists (NZAS) Cranwell Medal for Science communication (2020)
- Association of Adventist Women (AAW) Woman of the Year (2021)
- Fulbright Scholarship (2020)
- Te Puiaki Whakapā Pūtaiao Science Communication Prize (2022)
- Callaghan Medal (2024)

== Personal life ==
Sika-Paotonu is married to Reno Paotonu and they have one daughter.

== Selected publications ==
- Julie Bennett; Jane Zhang; William Leung; et al. (1 January 2021). "Rising Ethnic Inequalities in Acute Rheumatic Fever and Rheumatic Heart Disease, New Zealand, 2000-2018". Emerging Infectious Diseases. 27 (1). doi:10.3201/eid2701.191791. ISSN 1080-6040. PMC 7774562. PMID 33350929. Wikidata Q104556699.
- Sara Filoche; Peter Stone; Fiona Cram; et al. (7 January 2020). "Uncovering social structures and informational prejudices to reduce inequity in delivery and uptake of new molecular technologies". Journal of Medical Ethics. doi:10.1136/medethics-2019-105734. ISSN 0306-6800. PMID 31911498. Wikidata Q92479608.
- Julie Bennett; Nikki Moreland; Jane Oliver; et al. (17 July 2019). "Understanding group A streptococcal pharyngitis and skin infections as causes of rheumatic fever: protocol for a prospective disease incidence study". BMC Infectious Diseases. 19 (1): 633. doi:10.1186/s12879-019-4126-9. ISSN 1471-2334. PMC 6637506. PMID 31315580. Wikidata Q91964403.
- Robert M Hand; Sam Salman; Nelly Newall; et al. (1 July 2019). "A population pharmacokinetic study of benzathine benzylpenicillin G administration in children and adolescents with rheumatic heart disease: new insights for improved secondary prophylaxis strategies". Journal of Antimicrobial Chemotherapy. 74 (7): 1984–1991. doi:10.1093/jac/dkz076. ISSN 0305-7453. PMC 6587412. PMID 30989171. Wikidata Q93116628.
- Stephen P Robertson; Jennie Harre Hindmarsh; Sarah Berry; et al. (17 August 2018). "Genomic medicine must reduce, not compound, health inequities: the case for hauora-enhancing genomic resources for New Zealand". The New Zealand Medical Journal. 131 (1480): 81–89. ISSN 0028-8446. PMID 30116069. Wikidata Q90989601.
- Dianne Sika-Paotonu; Brian Robinson; Tim Maling (1 September 2017). "Engaging Postgraduate Students Undertaking Clinical Pharmacology Using GoSoapBox for Problem-Based Learning". Journal of Nursing Education. 56 (9): 575–576. doi:10.3928/01484834-20170817-14. ISSN 0148-4834. PMID 28876448. Wikidata Q50215869.
- Dianne Sika-Paotonu; Andrea Beaton; Aparna Raghu; Andrew Steer; Jonathan Carapetis (6 April 2017), Acute Rheumatic Fever and Rheumatic Heart Disease, PMID 28379675, Wikidata Q95513977
- Troels R Petersen; Dianne Sika-Paotonu; Deborah A Knight; Helen M A Simkins; Ian F Hermans (31 March 2011). "Exploiting the role of endogenous lymphoid-resident dendritic cells in the priming of NKT cells and CD8+ T cells to dendritic cell-based vaccines". PLOS One. 6 (3) e17657. Bibcode:2011PLoSO...617657P. doi:10.1371/journal.pone.0017657. ISSN 1932-6203. PMC 3069042. PMID 21483862. Wikidata Q28741462.
- Troels R Petersen; Dianne Sika-Paotonu; Deborah A Knight; Nina Dickgreber; Kathryn J Farrand; Franca Ronchese; Ian F Hermans (9 February 2010). "Potent anti-tumor responses to immunization with dendritic cells loaded with tumor tissue and an NKT cell ligand". Immunology & Cell Biology. 88 (5): 596–604. doi:10.1038/icb.2010.9. ISSN 0818-9641. PMID 20142835. Wikidata Q54278437.
- Brett Delahunt; Peter B Bethwaite; Rose J Miller; Dianne Sika-Paotonu; John R Srigley (20 November 2010). "Re: Fuhrman grade provides higher prognostic accuracy than nucleolar grade for papillary renal cell carcinoma: T. Klatte, C. Anterasian, J. W. Said, M. de Martino, F. F. Kabbinavar, A. S. Belldegrun and A. J. Pantuck J Urol 2010; 183: 2143-2147". The Journal of Urology. 185 (1): 356-7; author reply 357-8. doi:10.1016/j.juro.2010.08.045. ISSN 0022-5347. PMID 21094961. Wikidata Q44694147.
