= Food Packaging Forum =

Swiss research foundation on food packaging

- Abbreviation: FPF
- Founded: 2012
- Type: Nonprofit research foundation
- Headquarters: Zurich, Switzerland
- Region served: Worldwide
- Key people: Jane Muncke, Managing Director and Chief Scientific Officer; Martin Scheringer, President of the Foundation Board
- Website: www.foodpackagingforum.org

The Food Packaging Forum Foundation (FPF) is a nonprofit research foundation based in Zurich, Switzerland. Established in 2012, it conducts and communicates research concerning chemicals in food contact materials, including food packaging, food-processing equipment and kitchenware.

The foundation's work includes research on chemical migration, endocrine-active substances, microplastics and human exposure to food-contact chemicals. Its research has been reported by publications including The Guardian, Reuters, Le Monde, Wired and Scientific American.

== History and purpose ==
The foundation was established in 2012 to provide information about the scientific and regulatory issues associated with food-contact materials. Its stated purpose is to support the use of scientific evidence in decisions concerning the health and environmental effects of food packaging.

FPF conducts research, publishes summaries of scientific and regulatory developments and maintains databases concerning chemicals used or detected in food-contact materials. It has also participated in European and international research projects concerning chemicals, plastics and packaging.

== Research ==
=== Food-contact chemicals ===
FPF researchers have studied chemicals intentionally used in the manufacture of food-contact materials and substances that migrate or can be extracted from packaging and related products.

A 2021 study published in Environment International compiled information on more than 12,000 intentionally used food-contact chemicals. The authors compared the substances with publicly available hazard information and reported that hazard data were unavailable for many of them.

Another systematic evidence map examined chemicals detected in extracts and migrates from food-contact materials. The research found that many detected substances did not appear on lists of chemicals known to be intentionally used in food-contact applications. The findings received coverage in The Guardian.

=== Human exposure ===
In 2024, FPF researchers and collaborators published a systematic review of food-contact chemicals measured in human biological samples. The researchers reported evidence that 3,601 known food-contact chemicals had been detected in samples such as blood, urine and breast milk.

The results were reported by Le Monde, The Washington Post, CNN and packaging-industry publications.

A separate 2024 study led by FPF researchers compared chemicals used in food-contact materials with a list of known or suspected mammary carcinogens.

=== Plastics and microplastics ===
FPF researchers have contributed to studies and evidence maps concerning chemicals used in plastics and the release of micro- and nanoplastics from food-contact products.

The PlastChem project reported that more than 16,000 chemicals were associated with plastics and that information about identity, use and hazards was incomplete for many substances. The findings were independently reported by Reuters.

In 2025, researchers associated with FPF published a systematic evidence map examining micro- and nanoplastics released from food-contact articles during their intended use.

== Databases ==
The foundation maintains several publicly accessible databases developed from its research.

The Food Contact Chemicals Database compiles chemicals identified as intentionally used in food-contact materials. It was developed in connection with the 2021 Environment International study.

The Database on Migrating and Extractable Food Contact Chemicals contains evidence about substances measured in food-contact material extracts and migration studies.

The Food Contact Chemicals Monitored in Humans database organizes human biomonitoring evidence used in the foundation's systematic review of exposure to food-contact chemicals.

FPF also maintains an evidence map concerning micro- and nanoplastics released from food-contact articles.

== Policy use and public communication ==
Research involving FPF has been cited in reports published by the United Nations Environment Programme, European Union institutions and national public-health agencies.

The foundation publishes summaries of research and regulatory developments and organizes workshops and webinars concerning food-contact materials. A 2014 report in Food Production Daily described an FPF workshop about the management of hazardous chemicals in food-contact materials.

== Governance and funding ==
The foundation is governed by a Foundation Board and receives scientific advice from a separate advisory board. As of 2026, Martin Scheringer serves as president of the Foundation Board, while Jane Muncke is the managing director and chief scientific officer.

According to its financial disclosures, FPF receives unrestricted donations and project-specific grants from charitable foundations, public research programmes and companies. The organization states that unrestricted donors do not control its research or publications. The foundation is listed in the European Union Transparency Register.

== See also ==
- Food contact materials
- Environmental health
- Microplastics
- Packaging
- Plastic pollution
- Chemical safety
