= Di McCarthy =

New Zealand scientist (died 2025)

Di McCarthy CNZM CRSNZ
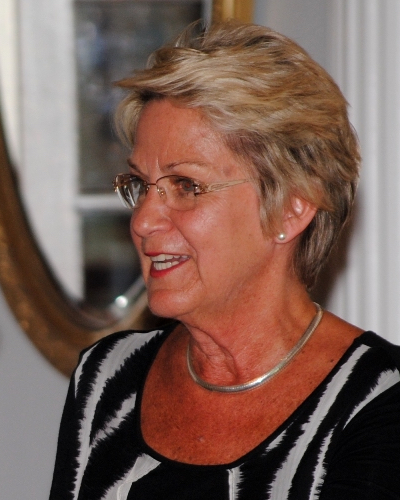
- McCarthy in 2011
- Born: Dianne Christine McCarthy
- Died: 5 April 2025; Blenheim, New Zealand
- Education: University of Auckland
- Scientific career
- Fields: Behavioural neuroscience
- Workplaces: University of Auckland
- Thesis: A behavioural analysis of signal-detection performance (1979)
- Doctoral students: Rita Krishnamurthi

Dianne Christine McCarthy CNZM CRSNZ (died 5 April 2025) was a New Zealand scientist and professional director. She served as the chief executive of the Royal Society of New Zealand between 2007 and 2014.

== Education ==
McCarthy completed a Bachelor of Arts degree in mathematics and music, followed by a Master of Science degree at the University of Auckland. She also completed a PhD in experimental psychology at the university in 1979. The title of her doctoral thesis was A behavioural analysis of signal-detection performance.

== Professional life ==
McCarthy held a number of senior management and governance roles in the tertiary education, science and health sectors. She was a professor and pro vice-chancellor of the University of Auckland, and served as the chief executive of the Royal Society of New Zealand from 2007 to 2014, after two terms on the society's council from 2000 to 2007.

McCarthy published scientific literature in the area of behavioural neuroscience and lectured in this area at the University of Auckland from 1981, becoming head of the Department of Psychology in 1991. In 1995, she was promoted to professor and served as associate dean of the university's Faculty of Medical and Health Sciences.

McCarthy sat on a number of company boards, including Powerhouse Ventures Ltd, and the Cawthron Institute, and was a member of the governance boards of the Dodd-Walls Centre for Photonic and Quantum Technologies, and the Healthier Lives National Science Challenge. She was also acting chair of the Ageing Well National Science Challenge. She was a trustee of the Malaghan Institute of Medical Research and the Hearing Research Foundation (NZ), and a member of the Science Advisory Board of the Centre for Brain Research at the University of Auckland. She served on the boards of the New Zealand Institute of Economic Research and of the Bragato Research Institute.

Notable doctoral students of McCarthy's include Rita Krishnamurthi.

=== Advocacy for women ===
McCarthy was co-opted into the Royal Society of New Zealand Council to improve the representation of women. According to the official Royal Society of New Zealand history, Illuminating Our World, McCarthy found the Society "rather inward-looking, with little engagement and established in its ways".

While chief executive of the Royal Society, McCarthy helped to establish the New Zealand Women in Leadership programme that helped women in tertiary institutions to become leaders. She was interested in equity issues throughout her career, being appointed pro vice-chancellor of equal opportunities at the University of Auckland in 2005. She served as a New Zealand judge for the L'Oréal-UNESCO For Women in Science Awards.

== Death ==
McCarthy died in Blenheim on 5 April 2025. She had been predeceased by her husband, Frank Metcalfe, in January 2025.

== Honours ==
McCarthy was appointed an Officer of the New Zealand Order of Merit, for services to education, in the 2008 Queen's Birthday Honours, and a Companion of the Royal Society of New Zealand for her services to science in 2015. In the 2016 Queen's Birthday Honours, she was promoted to Companion of the New Zealand Order of Merit, for services to science, business and women. When she was awarded the honour, she said she wanted to let young women know that science is not just for boys.
