= Cranwell Medal =

New Zealand science communicator award

The Cranwell Medal, previously the Science Communicator Medal, is awarded by the New Zealand Association of Scientists to a "practising scientist for excellence in communicating science to the general public in any area of science or technology". Prior to 2017 this medal was called the Science Communicator Medal, but was renamed to honour the botanist Lucy Cranwell.

In 1999 and 2000 the award was given as a number of Foundation for Research, Science and Technology Science Communicator Awards.

== Recipients ==
Year	Recipient	Institution	Field
1999	Hamish Campbell	Institute of Geological and Nuclear Sciences	
1999	Tim Bell	University of Canterbury	
1999	Louise Thomas	Freelance writer, Wellington	
1999	Heather Worth	University of Auckland	
1999	Tony Conner	Crop and Food Research	
1999	Allen Heath; Dallas Bishop; David Cole	AgResearch	
1999	Bob Brockie	Victoria University of Wellington	
2000	Phil L'Huillier	AgResearch	
2000	Caroline Cook	Dunedin International Science Festival	
2001	Chris De Freitas	University of Auckland	Global warming
2002	Jonathan Hickford	Lincoln University	Biochemistry
2003	Cornel de Ronde	Institute of Geological and Nuclear Sciences	
2004	Peter Buchanan	Manaaki Whenua – Landcare Research	Fungal systematics
2005	Alison Campbell; Penny Cooke	University of Waikato	
2006	Liz Carpenter	AgResearch	
2007	Simon Pollard	Canterbury Museum	Invertebrate zoology
2008	Ian Spellerberg	Lincoln University	
2009	Ian Shaw	University of Canterbury	Chemicals in food
2010	Marc Wilson	Victoria University of Wellington	Psychology
2011	Mark Quigley	University of Canterbury	Active tectonics and geomorphology
2012	Siouxsie Wiles	University of Auckland	Microbiology
2013	Simon Lamb	Victoria University of Wellington	Climate change
2014	Michelle Dickinson	University of Auckland	Fracture mechanics and nanotechnology
2015	Christopher Battershill; David Schiel	University of Waikato	Coastal ecology
2015	Christopher Battershill; David Schiel	University of Canterbury	Coastal ecology
2016	Jean Fleming	University of Otago	
2017	Ocean Ripeka Mercier	Victoria University of Wellington	
2018	Judith Bateup	University of Otago	
2019	Jeanette McLeod; Phil Wilson	University of Canterbury	Mathematics
2020	Dianne Sika-Paotonu	University of Otago	Biomedical science
2021	Michael Baker	University of Otago	Public health medicine
2022	Catriona MacLeod	Manaaki Whenua – Landcare Research	Biodiversity
2023	Natalie Netzler; Chris Puli'uvea	University of Auckland	Māori and Pacific community heath
2024	Colin Miskelly	Te Papa	Ornithology
2025	Nic Rawlence	University of Otago	Palaeontology
