= Jose L. Jimenez =

Jose L. Jimenez may refer to:

- José Jiménez Negrón (José Luis Jiménez Negrón, born 1954), Puerto Rican politician
- Jose L. Jimenez (chemist), Spanish–American chemist
