= Franca Ronchese =

Italian-New Zealand immunologist

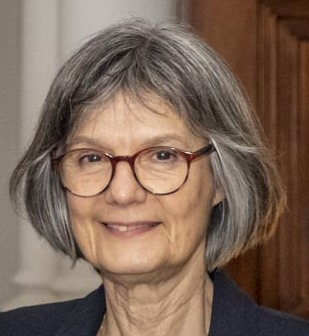
- Ronchese in 2023
- Born: Italy
- Education: University of Padua
- Spouse: Graham Le Gros
- Awards: Burnet Oration
- Scientific career
- Fields: Immunology
- Workplaces: National Institutes of Health; Basel Institute for Immunology; Malaghan Institute
- Doctoral students: Dianne Sika-Paotonu

Franca Ronchese is an Italian-New Zealand immunologist. She currently leads the immune cell biology programme at the Malaghan Institute of Medical Research in Wellington, New Zealand and is a research professor at Victoria University of Wellington.

== Career ==
After a PhD at the University of Padua, Italy, Ronchese worked as a postdoctoral fellow in the laboratory of Ronald Germain at the National Institutes of Health in the United States. After her postdoctoral studies, she joined the Basel Institute for Immunology, Switzerland, where she became interested in antigen presentation by dendritic cells in vivo. In 1994, Ronchese moved to New Zealand to establish her research programme at the Malaghan Institute of Medical Research, with a focus on developing immune therapies for cancer and allergies. Her current research focuses on dendritic cells (a kind of immune cell), and includes allergic response work.

In 2012, Ronchese was a finalist in the NEXT Woman of the Year awards. In 2018, she was invited to give the Australian and New Zealand Society for Immunology's Burnet Oration.

== Personal life ==
Ronchese is married to Graham Le Gros, research director of the Malaghan Institute.

== Selected publications ==
- Racioppi, Luigi; Ronchese, Franca; Matis, Louis A.; Germain, R. N. (1993). "Peptide-major histocompatibility complex class II complexes with mixed agonist/antagonist properties provide evidence for ligand-related differences in T cell receptor-dependent intracellular signaling". Journal of Experimental Medicine. 177 (4): 1047–1060. doi:10.1084/jem.177.4.1047. PMC 2190984. PMID 8384651.
- Harris, Nicola L.; Watt, Victoria; Ronchese, Franca; Le Gros, Graham (2002). "Differential T cell function and fate in lymph node and nonlymphoid tissues". Journal of Experimental Medicine. 195 (3): 317–326. doi:10.1084/jem.20011558. PMC 2193599. PMID 11828006.
- Harris, Nicola L.; Ronchese, Franca (1999). "The role of B7 costimulation in T-cell immunity". Immunology and Cell Biology. 77 (4): 304–311. doi:10.1046/j.1440-1711.1999.00835.x. PMID 10457196. S2CID 25675608.
- Hermans, Ian F.; Ritchie, David S.; Yang, Jianping; Roberts, Joanna M.; Ronchese, Franca (2000). "CD8+ T cell-dependent elimination of dendritic cells in vivo limits the induction of antitumor immunity". Journal of Immunology. 164 (6): 3095–3101. doi:10.4049/jimmunol.164.6.3095. PMID 10706699. S2CID 22010635.
- Harris, Nicola L.; Watt, Victoria; Ronchese, Franca; Le Gros, Graham (2002). "Differential T cell function and fate in lymph node and nonlymphoid tissues". Journal of Experimental Medicine. 195 (3): 317–326. doi:10.1084/jem.20011558. PMC 2193599. PMID 11828006.
- Ohta, Akio; Gorelik, Elieser; Prasad, Simon J.; Ronchese, Franca; Lukashev, Dmitriy; Wong, Michael K. K.; Huang, Xiaojun; et al. (2006). "A2A adenosine receptor protects tumors from antitumor T cells". Proceedings of the National Academy of Sciences. 103 (35): 13132–13137. Bibcode:2006PNAS..10313132O. doi:10.1073/pnas.0605251103. PMC 1559765. PMID 16916931.
- Prout, M. S.; Kyle, R.L.; Ronchese, F.; Le Gros, G. (2018). "IL-4 is a key requirement for IL-4 and IL-4/IL-13 expressing CD4 Th2 subsets in lung and skin". Frontiers in Immunology. 9: 1211. doi:10.3389/fimmu.2018.01211. PMC 5992292. PMID 29910811.
- Gilfillan, C. B.; Kuhn, S.; Baey, C.; Hyde, E. J.; Yang, J.; Ruedl, C.; Ronchese, F. (2018). "Clec9A+ dendritic cells are not essential for antitumor CD8+ T cell responses induced by poly I:C immunotherapy". Journal of Immunology. 200 (8): 2978–2986. doi:10.4049/jimmunol.1701593. PMID 29507107. S2CID 4716259.
- Hilligan, K. L.; Ronchese, F. (2020). "Antigen presentation by dendritic cells and their instruction of CD4+ T helper cell responses". Cellular & Molecular Immunology. 17 (6): 587–599. doi:10.1038/s41423-020-0465-0. PMC 7264306. PMID 32433540.
- Ronchese, F.; Hilligan, K. L.; Mayer, J. U. (2020). "Dendritic cells and the skin environment". Current Opinion in Immunology. 64: 56–62. doi:10.1016/j.coi.2020.03.006. PMID 32387901. S2CID 218584890.
- Mayer, J. U.; Hilligan, K. L.; Chandler, J. S.; Ronchese, F.; et al. (2021). "Homeostatic IL-13 in healthy skin directs dendritic cell differentiation to promote TH2 and inhibit TH17 cell polarization". Nature Immunology. 22 (12): 1538–1550. doi:10.1038/s41590-021-01067-0. PMID 34795444. S2CID 244402814.
