= Len Malaghan =

New Zealand businessman, benefactor

- Born: Leonard Aloysius Patrick Malaghan; 18 February 1906; Queenstown, New Zealand
- Died: 25 December 1967 (aged 61); Khandallah, New Zealand
- Occupation: Dairy businessman

Leonard Aloysius Patrick Malaghan (18 February 1906 – 25 December 1967) was a New Zealand dairy factory manager, ice-cream manufacturer, businessman, and benefactor. He was born in Queenstown, New Zealand, on 18 February 1906. He headed the Tip Top Ice Cream Company (now part of the Fonterra Co-operative Group).

In 1967, Malaghan developed Hodgkin's disease, of which he died. Prior to his death, he and his wife, Ann, donated £200,000 of shares to the Wellington Medical Research Foundation. The gift was used to establish what is now the Malaghan Institute of Medical Research.

Malaghan was inducted into the New Zealand Business Hall of Fame in 2007.
