= Colin Miskelly =

New Zealand ornithologist

- Born: 1962/1963 (age 63–64)
- Education: University of Canterbury
- Known for: New Zealand Birds Online website
- Awards: Cranwell Medal (2024)
- Scientific career
- Fields: Ornithology
- Workplaces: Department of Conservation; Te Papa
- Thesis: Social and Environmental Constraints on Breeding by New Zealand Snipe Coenocorypha aucklandica (1989)

Colin Miskelly (born 1962/1963) is a New Zealand ornithologist and museum curator.

== Biography ==
Miskelly's father was a mechanical engineer and his mother was a nurse. At the age of 13 he became a member of the Ornithological Society of New Zealand, and at age 15, he spent six weeks on the Chatham Islands on an expedition focussed on the Chatham Island tāiko (Pterodroma magentae). In 1983 he received a Queen Elizabeth II Commonwealth Scholarship. From November 1983 to January 1984, alongside Don Merton, he was part of a team of conservationists who witnessed a successful breeding season of the Chatham Islands black robin (Petroica traversi) on Rangatira Island. During this period the total population was doubled from nine to 18 individuals. In 1985, Miskelly received a Bachelor of Science degree summa cum laude from the University of Canterbury. After studying for a doctorate at the same university, he received his Ph.D. in 1989 with the dissertation Social and Environmental Constraints on Breeding by New Zealand Snipe Coenocorypha aucklandica. He has spent six summers on the Snares Islands studying snipe.

From February 1991 to May 2010, Miskelly was a conservancy advisory scientist, technical support manager, and conservation analyst with the Department of Conservation (DOC), including representing DOC on the board of the Karori Sanctuary Trust (the operator of Zealandia) from 1998 to 2010. He then moved to the Museum of New Zealand Te Papa Tongarewa, where he became curator of vertebrates. He was the driving force behind the creation of the New Zealand Birds Online website, launched in 2013. Over a hundred expert authors and over 500 photographers have been involved in creating this digital encyclopedia, which records all of New Zealand's bird species (extant or extinct). As of December 2024, Miskelly remains as the site administrator.

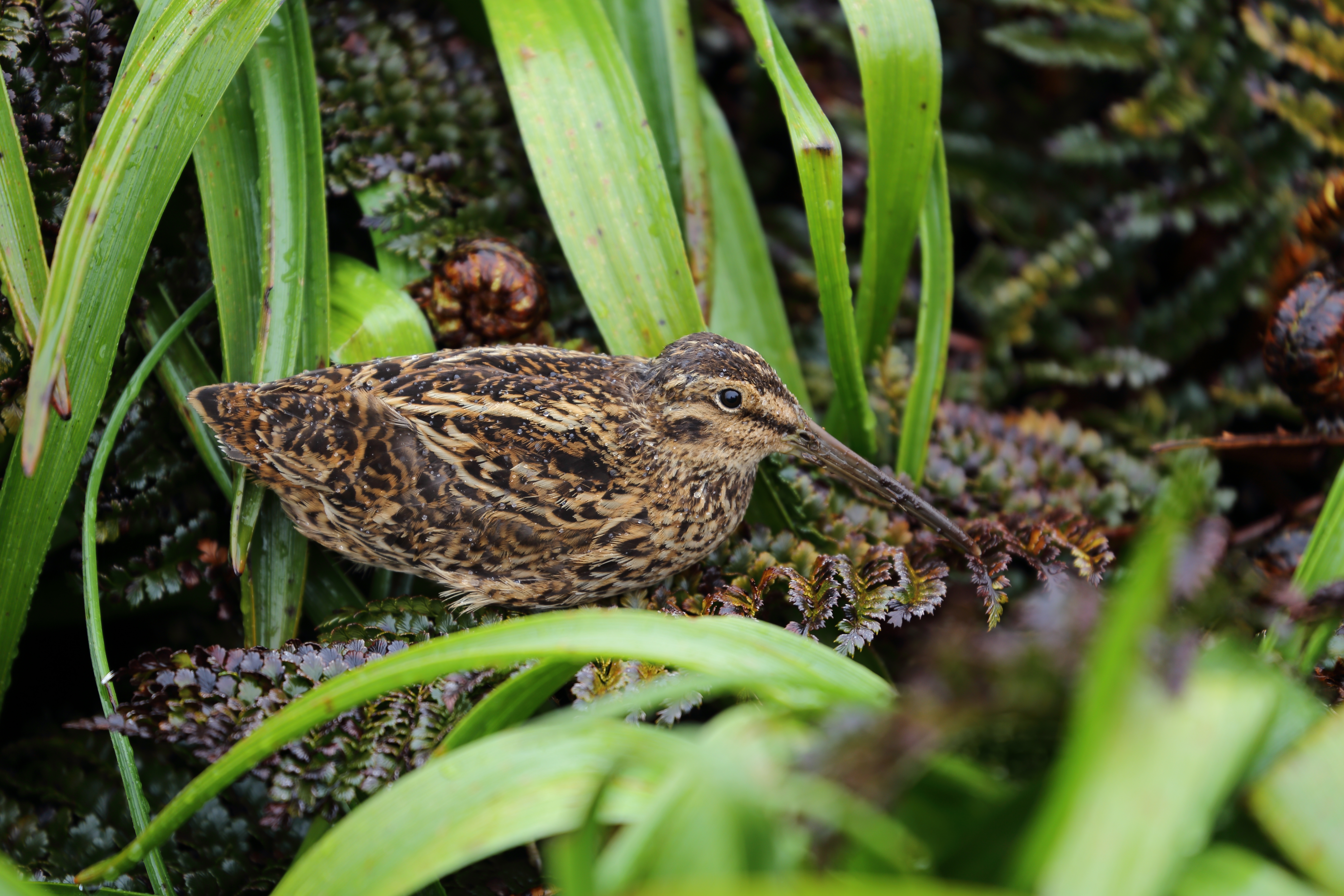
A snipe on Campbell Island in 2017

Miskelly's special area of interest is the New Zealand snipe (Coenocorypha). In 2002, a revision of the genus carried out in collaboration with Trevor Worthy led to the elevation of the former subspecies Coenocorypha aucklandica iredalei, Coenocorypha aucklandica huegeli and Coenocorypha aucklandica barrierensis to species status. In 2010 he and Allan J. Baker (1943–2014) described the subspecies Coenocorypha aucklandica perseverance.

In 2018, Miskelly was part of a team of scientists that first described the critically endangered diving petrel species Whenua Hou diving petrel (Pelecanoides whenuahouensis) from Codfish Island / Whenua Hou. This taxon was originally considered a population of the broad-billed guillemot petrel (Pelecanoides georgicus).

Over the period November 2023 to March 2024, Miskelly undertook a trek along the full 3,000 kilometres (1,900 mi) length of the Te Araroa Trail from Cape Reinga to Bluff making observations of birds at 2 kilometres (1.2 mi) intervals along the way. The observations were reported progressively in blog posts during the walk.

As of September 2026, Miskelly has authored 104 publications in the journal Notornis.

== Selected publications ==
=== Journal articles ===
- Raewyn Empson; Colin Miskelly (1999). "The risks, costs and benefits of using brodifacoum to eradicate rats from Kapiti Island, New Zealand" (PDF). New Zealand Journal of Ecology. 23 (2): 241 – 254. Wikidata Q141474432.
- Colin M. Miskelly; Graeme A. Taylor (2004). "Establishment of a colony of Common Diving Petrels (Pelecanoides urinatrix) by chick transfers and acoustic attraction". Emu. 104 (3): 205–211. doi:10.1071/mu03062. Wikidata Q141474476.
- Colin Miskelly; Graeme Arthur Taylor; Helen Gummer; Rex Williams (2009). "Translocations of eight species of burrow-nesting seabirds (genera Pterodroma, Pelecanoides, Pachyptila and Puffinus: Family Procellariidae)". Biological Conservation. 142 (10): 1965–1980. doi:10.1016/j.biocon.2009.03.027. Wikidata Q141235283.
- Colin Miskelly; Ralph Graham Powlesland (2013). "Conservation translocations of New Zealand birds, 1863-2012" (PDF). Notornis. 60: 3–28. Wikidata Q141474461.
- Holly P Jones; Nick D Holmes; Stuart H M Butchart; et al. (2016). "Invasive mammal eradication on islands results in substantial conservation gains". Proceedings of the National Academy of Sciences of the United States of America. 113 (15): 4033–4038. Bibcode:2016PNAS..113.4033J. doi:10.1073/pnas.1521179113. PMC 4839448. PMID 27001852. Wikidata Q30384910.
- Theresa L. Cole; Ludovic Dutoit; Nicolas Dussex; et al. (2019). "Receding ice drove parallel expansions in Southern Ocean penguins". Proceedings of the National Academy of Sciences of the United States of America. doi:10.1073/pnas.1904048116. PMID 31843914. Wikidata Q92023549.
- Carl H Oliveros; Daniel J. Field; Daniel T Ksepka; et al. (2019). "Earth history and the passerine superradiation". Proceedings of the National Academy of Sciences of the United States of America. 116 (16): 7916–7925. doi:10.1073/pnas.1813206116. PMC 6475423. PMID 30936315. Wikidata Q63090513.
- Rebecca K. French; Sandra H. Anderson; Kristal E. Cain; et al. (2023). "Host phylogeny shapes viral transmission networks in an island ecosystem". Nature Ecology & Evolution. 7 (11): 1834–1843. doi:10.1038/s41559-023-02192-9. Wikidata Q135940485.

=== New Zealand Threat Classification System ===
- Andrew J. Townsend; Peter J. de Lange; Clinton A. J. Duffy; Colin M. Miskelly; Janice Molloy; David A. Norton (2008). New Zealand Threat Classification System manual (PDF). Department of Conservation. p. 36. ISBN 978-0-478-14364-5. LCCN 2008396496. OCLC 191868082. OL 16866114M. Wikidata Q105979878.
- Hugh Alexander Robertson; Karen A. Baird; Graeme P. Elliott; et al. (2021). "Conservation status of birds in Aotearoa New Zealand, 2021" (PDF). New Zealand Threat Classification Series. Wikidata Q124308704.

=== Books ===
- In 2008 he edited the book Chatham Islands: Heritage and Conservation.
- In 2020, along with co-author Craig Symes, Miskelly edited a collection of papers entitled Lost Gold: Ornithology of the subantarctic Auckland Islands.

== Awards ==
- In 2019, Miskelly was made an honorary lifetime member of Zealandia for his work as a conservation advisor and trustee.
- In 2021, Miskelly and his co-author Craig Symes won the Royal Zoological Society of New South Wales Whitley Award for the book Lost Gold: Ornithology of the subantarctic Auckland Islands.
- In 2023 Miskelly was made an honorary lifetime member of the Friends of Mana Island.
- In 2024, Miskelly was elected as a Fellow of the Ornithological Society of New Zealand. The same year, he was awarded the Cranwell Medal by the New Zealand Association of Scientists, for "excellence in communicating science to the general public in any area of science or technology".
