= Jim Watson (biologist) =

New Zealand bio-technologist and entrepreneur (1943–2017)

Jim Watson CNZM
- Born: 1943; Te Teko, New Zealand
- Died: 13 February 2017 (aged 73); Auckland, New Zealand
- Education: University of Auckland
- Scientific career
- Thesis: Ribonucleic acids in relation to growth (1967)

James Douglas Watson CNZM (1943 – 13 February 2017) was a New Zealand biotechnologist and entrepreneur.

== Biography ==
After growing up in Te Teko in the Bay of Plenty, Watson completed a Master of Science degree and then a PhD at the University of Auckland. He then moved to California, working at the Syntex Corporation, Palo Alto and the Salk Institute for Biological Studies in La Jolla, and then to Department of Microbiology at the University of California. He returned to the University of Auckland as professor of microbiology. Notable students of Watson's include immunologist Graham Le Gros.

In 1994, Watson established Genesis Research and Development, an NZX-listed, now defunct, biotechnology company based in Auckland.

After a being diagnosed with prostate cancer, he founded Caldera Health with Richard Forster (who was also diagnosed with the cancer) to focus specifically on the disease.

Watson served as president of the Royal Society of New Zealand between 2004 and 2006; he was preceded in that role by Gil Simpson and followed by Neville Jordan. In the 2006 Queen's Birthday Honours, Watson was appointed a Companion of the New Zealand Order of Merit, for services to scientific and medical research.

Watson died on 13 February 2017 from prostate cancer, aged 73.
