= Paul Callaghan =

New Zealand physicist (1947–2012)

Sir Paul Callaghan GNZM FRS FRSNZ
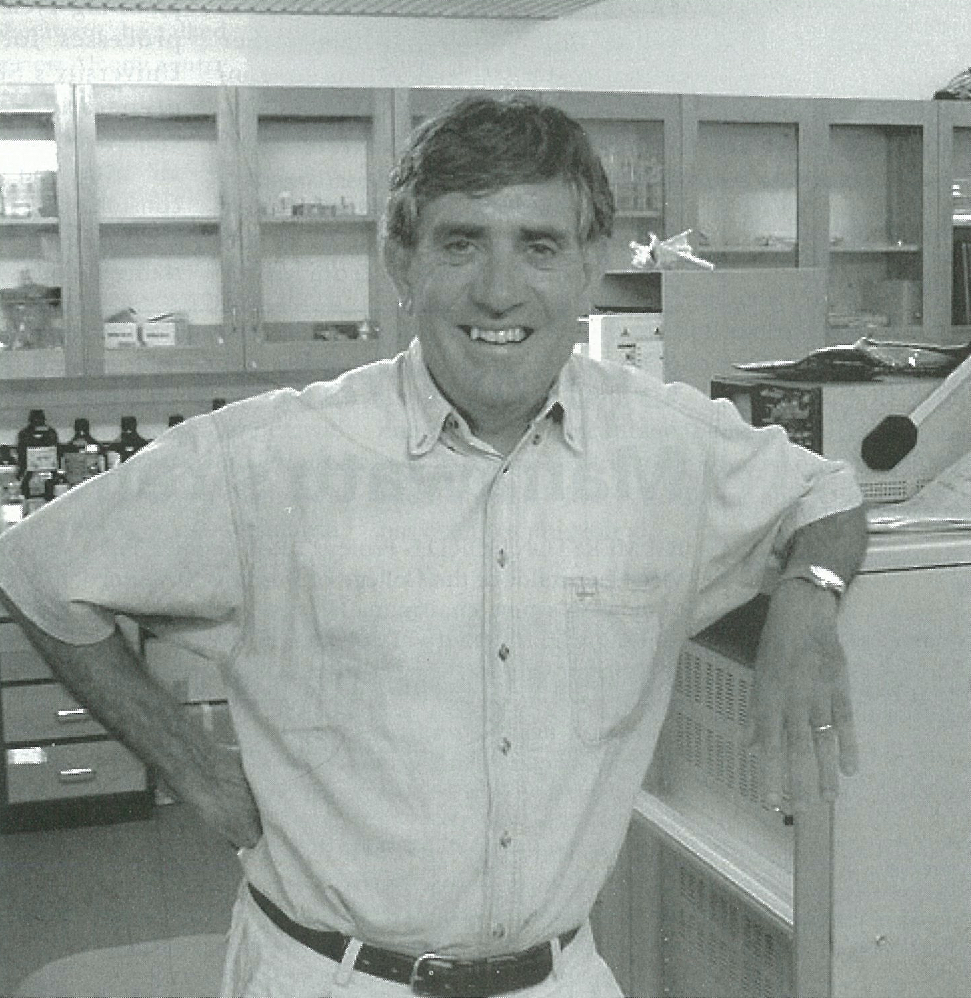
- Callaghan in 2001
- Born: Paul Terence Callaghan; 19 August 1947; Whanganui, New Zealand
- Died: 24 March 2012 (aged 64); Wellington, New Zealand
- Education: Victoria University of Wellington (BSc); University of Oxford (DPhil)
- Known for: NMR and MRI research
- Awards: New Zealand Order of Merit; Rutherford Medal; Günther Laukien Prize; James Cook Research Fellowship (2008); 2011 New Zealander of the Year
- Scientific career
- Fields: Physics, molecular physics
- Workplaces: Massey University
- Thesis: Some hyperfine interaction studies using nuclear orientation (1974)
- Doctoral advisor: Nicholas James Stone

Sir Paul Terence Callaghan GNZM FRS FRSNZ (/ˈkæləhæn/ KAL-ə-han; 19 August 1947 – 24 March 2012) was a New Zealand physicist who, as the founding director of the MacDiarmid Institute for Advanced Materials and Nanotechnology at Victoria University of Wellington, held the position of Alan MacDiarmid Professor of Physical Sciences and was President of the International Society of Magnetic Resonance.

== Biography ==
Callaghan was born on 19 August 1947, the son of Mavis and Ernest Callaghan. He had an older brother Jim, older sister Jeanine, and younger sister Mary. His maternal grandparents were Agnes and Francis Hogg.

A native of Whanganui, Callaghan attended Wanganui Technical College (now Wanganui City College). He took his first degree in physics at Victoria University of Wellington and subsequently earned a DPhil degree at the University of Oxford, working in low temperature physics. On his return to New Zealand in 1974, he took up a lecturing position at Massey University, where he began researching the applications of magnetic resonance to the study of soft matter. He was made Professor of Physics in 1984, and was appointed Alan MacDiarmid Professor of Physical Sciences in 2001. The following year, as its founding director, he helped establish the multi-university MacDiarmid Institute for Advanced Materials and Nanotechnology.

Callaghan was President of the Academy Council of the Royal Society of New Zealand (RSNZ), and published over 240 articles in scientific journals, as well as the books Principles of Nuclear Magnetic Resonance Microscopy in 1994 and Translational Dynamics and Magnetic Resonance in 2011. He was a founding director and shareholder of Magritek, a technology company based in Wellington that sells nuclear magnetic resonance and MRI instruments. He was a regular public speaker on science matters and, in 2007, one of his radio series, of discussions with Kim Hill on Radio New Zealand appeared in book form as As Far as We Know: Conversations about Science, Life and the Universe. A 2009 book, Wool to Weta: Transforming New Zealand's Culture and Economy, dealt with the potential for science and technology entrepreneurialism to diversify New Zealand's economy. He was the presenter of a concurrent documentary, Beyond the Farm and the Themepark, which deals with the same issues.

In 2001 Callaghan became the 36th New Zealander to be made a Fellow of the Royal Society of London. He was awarded the Ampere Prize in 2004 and the RSNZ's Rutherford Medal in 2005. He was appointed a Principal Companion of the New Zealand Order of Merit in the 2006 New Year Honours, and in 2007 was recognised with a World Class New Zealander Award and the Sir Peter Blake Medal. He was awarded a two-year James Cook Research Fellowship by the Royal Society of New Zealand in 2008. In 2009, he accepted re-designation as a Knight Grand Companion of the New Zealand Order of Merit following the reinstatement of titular honours by the New Zealand government.

In 2010 he was awarded the Günther Laukien Prize for Magnetic Resonance and shared the New Zealand Prime Minister's Science Prize. In 2011 he was named Kiwibank's New Zealander of the Year and later that year elected an Honorary Fellow of Corpus Christi College, Cambridge.

Callaghan died on 24 March 2012, aged 64, after a long battle with colon cancer. He was survived by his first wife, Sue Roberts, two children, Catherine and Chris, and his second wife Miang Lim. After his death, Callaghan was again recognised with a World Class New Zealand award, becoming the Supreme winner in May 2012.

The New Zealand Crown entity, Callaghan Innovation, formed in February 2013, was named after him.

He was an atheist.

== Areas of contribution ==
Callaghan was an author of over 230 journal articles. His research group specialised in developing NMR methodologies for the study of molecular dynamics and molecular organisation in complex fluids, soft matter and porous materials. Major areas of contribution include:

- Rheo-NMR (rheology of fluids studied by nuclear magnetic resonance)
- Diffusion of molecules in porous media (for example, studying the microscopic structure of sea ice).
- Development of NMR techniques that use the Earth's magnetic field.

== Positions ==
- 1974 Lecturer, Massey University, Palmerston North
- 1984 Professor of Physics, Massey University, Palmerston North
- 2001 Alan MacDiarmid Professor of Physical Sciences at Victoria University, Wellington

== Awards and honours ==
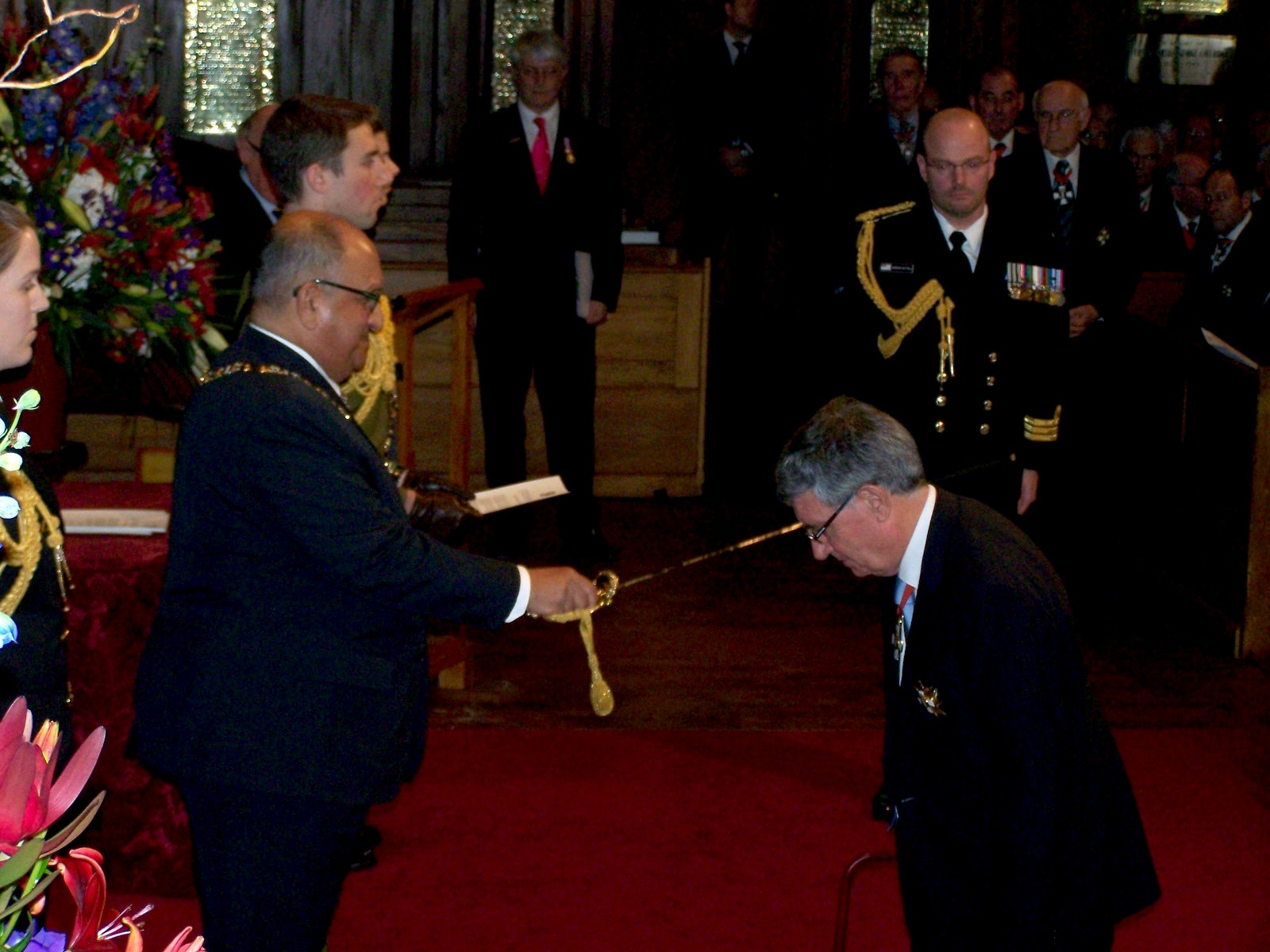
Callaghan's investiture as a Knight Grand Companion of the New Zealand Order of Merit by the governor-general, Sir Anand Satyanand, at Old St Paul's, Wellington, on 14 August 2009

- 2001 elected a Fellow of the Royal Society
- 2004 Ampere Prize
- 2005 Rutherford Medal
- 2006 Principal Companion of the New Zealand Order of Merit
- 2007 Sir Peter Blake Medal
- 2008 Dan Walls Medal (inaugural recipient)
- 2008 James Cook Research Fellowship by the Royal Society of New Zealand.
- 2009 Knighted
- 2010 Günther Laukien Prize for Magnetic Resonance
- 2010 New Zealand Prime Minister's Science Prize.
- 2011 New Zealander of the Year

== Callaghan Medal ==
The Royal Society of New Zealand established the Callaghan Medal in 2011 for "an outstanding contribution to science communication and raising public awareness of the value of science to human progress". Winners include:

- 2011 – Peter Gluckman
- 2012 – Shaun Hendy
- 2013 – Siouxsie Wiles
- 2014 – Peter Dearden
- 2015 – Michelle Dickinson
- 2016 – Hamish Spencer
- 2017 – Peter Shepherd
- 2018 – Helen Taylor
- 2019 – Ocean Mercier
- 2020 – Rangi Mātamua
- 2022 – Michael Baker
- 2023 – Mike Joy
- 2024 – Dianne Sika-Paotonu
- 2025 – Margaret Stanley
- 2026 – James Renwick

== Books ==
- Callaghan, P. (1994). Principles of Nuclear Magnetic Resonance Microscopy. Oxford University Press.
- Callaghan, P. and Hill, K. (2007). As Far as We Know: Conversations about Science, Life and the Universe. Penguin.
- Callaghan, P. (2009). Wool to Weta: Transforming New Zealand's Culture and Economy. Auckland University Press.
- Callaghan, P. (2011). Translational Dynamics and Magnetic Resonance: Principles of Pulsed Gradient Spin Echo NMR. Oxford University Press
- Callaghan, P. and Hendy, S. (2013). Get off the Grass: Kickstarting New Zealand’s Innovation Economy. Auckland University Press
