= Kjesten Wiig =

New Zealand scientist

Kjesten Wiig is a New Zealand neuroscientist who serves as the director of the Malaghan Institute of Medical Research, and professor at Victoria University of Wellington's Ferrier Research Institute.

Wiig spent 20 years as a neuroscientist in the United States, playing a key part in launching a bio-tech lab to develop memory loss drugs. She has over 23 patents to her name.

Wiig has also held senior positions at New Zealand's Ministry of Business, Innovation and Employment and was a key contributor to the creation of the New Zealand Space Agency.

== Early life and education ==
Wiig was born in Dunedin, New Zealand. She received a Bachelor of Arts with Honours in Psychology in 1990 and a PhD in Neuroscience in 1994, both from the University of Otago. In 1994, Wiig moved to the US to do a Postdoctoral Fellowship in the Department of Neuroscience at Brown University.

== Career ==
Wiig and her colleagues set up Sention Inc in 2000, a company that spun-out from her postdoctoral research at Brown University. As the associate director of Neuropharmacology, she designed and led preclinical programmes across multiple disease areas including memory loss and cognitive impairment in multiple sclerosis, Fragile X and autism. She played a key role in protecting intellectual property, securing angel and venture capital funding, navigating FDA drug approval processes, and advancing drug candidates to human trials. Sention Inc secured almost US$40 million of corporate and government funding.

Wiig returned to academia in 2005 as an adjunct professor at Brown University where she taught graduate-level cognitive neuroscience classes. Simultaneously, she was a founding member of Galenea, a spin-out company from MIT, where she worked as the Director of Behavioral Neuropharmacology. She was responsible for overseeing the testing of preclinical drug compounds for several indication areas including schizophrenia, Huntington's disease and obesity. She played a role in shaping the company's intellectual property strategy and business development efforts, while managing collaborations with universities, contract research organisations and pharmaceutical companies.

In 2012, Wiig moved back to New Zealand and worked for the Ministry of Business, Innovation and Employment. Here, she managed a commercialisation investment portfolio and went on to become the Director of Innovative Partnerships. Wiig was a contributor to the creation of the New Zealand Space Agency which encouraged the growth of domestic companies like Rocket Lab and positioned New Zealand as the location of choice for the emerging unmanned aviation and aerospace sector.

In January 2022 Wiig started working at the Malaghan Institute of Medical Research as the Director of Strategic Partnerships before being appointed as the deputy director of the institute in March 2024 and Director as of January 2025

She has been involved in establishing international research collaborations and working to bring New Zealand's first CAR T-cell cancer immunotherapy into the national healthcare system pending the completion of successful clinical trials.

She was the executive director of the Vaccine Alliance Aotearoa New Zealand—Ohu Kaupare Huaketo, a partnership of several New Zealand-based research organisations set up as part of the government's COVID-19 vaccine strategy to create vaccines in New Zealand.

Wiig is also co-director of New Zealand's RNA Development Platform and adjunct professor at the Ferrier Research Institute.

== Honours and awards ==
- BioTechNZ Hall of Fame (2023)

== Selected publications ==
- McGregor, Reuben; Paterson, Aimee; Lavender, Brittany; Hooker, Caitlin; Frampton, Chris; Wiig, Kjesten; Le Gros, Graham; Ussher, James E.; Brewerton, Maia; Moreland, Nicole J. (December 2024). "The SARS-CoV-2 neutralising antibody profile of New Zealand adults in 2023: Impact of vaccination and infection". Vaccine. 42 (26) 126482. doi:10.1016/j.vaccine.2024.126482. PMID 39467412.
- Cottrell, J. R.; Levenson, J. M.; Kim, S. H.; Gibson, H. E.; Richardson, K. A.; Sivula, M.; Li, B.; Ashford, C. J.; Heindl, K. A.; Babcock, R. J.; Rose, D. M.; Hempel, C. M.; Wiig, K. A.; Laeng, P.; Levin, M. E.; Ryan, T. A.; Gerber, D. J. (3 July 2013). "Working Memory Impairment in Calcineurin Knock-out Mice Is Associated with Alterations in Synaptic Vesicle Cycling and Disruption of High-Frequency Synaptic and Network Activity in Prefrontal Cortex". Journal of Neuroscience. 33 (27): 10938–10949. doi:10.1523/JNEUROSCI.5362-12.2013. PMC 3718364. PMID 23825400.
- Wiig, Kjesten A.; Whitlock, Jonathan R.; Epstein, Mel H.; Carpenter, Randall L.; Bear, Mark F. (July 2009). "The levo enantiomer of amphetamine increases memory consolidation and gene expression in the hippocampus without producing locomotor stimulation". Neurobiology of Learning and Memory. 92 (1): 106–113. doi:10.1016/j.nlm.2009.02.001. PMID 19368765.
- Burwell, Rebecca D.; Saddoris, Michael P.; Bucci, David J.; Wiig, Kjesten A. (14 April 2004). "Corticohippocampal Contributions to Spatial and Contextual Learning". The Journal of Neuroscience. 24 (15): 3826–3836. doi:10.1523/JNEUROSCI.0410-04.2004. PMC 6729354. PMID 15084664.
- Taubenfeld, Stephen M.; Wiig, Kjesten A.; Monti, Barbara; Dolan, Bridget; Pollonini, Gabriella; Alberini, Cristina M. (1 January 2001). "Fornix-Dependent Induction of Hippocampal CCAAT Enhancer-Binding Protein β and δ Co-Localizes with Phosphorylated cAMP Response Element-Binding Protein and Accompanies Long-Term Memory Consolidation". The Journal of Neuroscience. 21 (1): 84–91. doi:10.1523/JNEUROSCI.21-01-00084.2001. PMC 6762431. PMID 11150323.
- Taubenfeld, Stephen M.; Wiig, Kjesten A.; Bear, Mark F.; Alberini, Cristina M. (April 1999). "A molecular correlate of memory and amnesia in the hippocampus". Nature Neuroscience. 2 (4): 309–310. doi:10.1038/7217. PMID 10204535.
- Wiig, K A; Cooper, L N; Bear, M F (1996). "Temporally graded retrograde amnesia following separate and combined lesions of the perirhinal cortex and fornix in the rat". Learning & Memory. 3 (4): 313–325. doi:10.1101/lm.3.4.313. PMID 10456101.
