= Michelle Dickinson =

New Zealand nanotechnologist and science educator

Michelle Dickinson MNZM
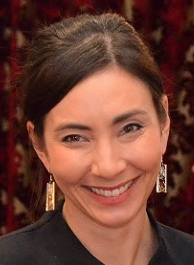
- Other name: Nanogirl
- Citizenship: New Zealand/UK
- Education: Biomedical Engineering and Ceramic and Materials Science and Engineering, Rutgers University
- Awards: Member of the New Zealand Order of Merit, Blake Medal
- Scientific career
- Fields: nanotechnology, science education
- Thesis: Surface variations affecting human dental enamel studied using nanomechanical and chemical analysis (2005)
- Website: www.medickinson.com

Michelle Emma Dickinson MNZM, also known as Nanogirl, is a nanotechnologist and science educator based in New Zealand.

== Early life and education ==
Dickinson grew up in Hong Kong, the United States, and the United Kingdom. She had a grandmother from Malta, a grandfather who was English, and a Hong Kong Chinese mother. Her father was an English-Maltese soldier.

She displayed skills in computer coding by the time she was eight years old. Dickinson completed a Master's in Engineering at the University of Manchester and a PhD in Biomedical Materials Engineering at Rutgers University.

Dickinson married businessman Joe Davis in 2018; they have twin children.

== Professional life ==
Dickinson was a senior lecturer (2009–2018) in Chemical and Material Engineering at Auckland University, and an associate investigator at the MacDiarmid Institute for Advanced Materials and Nanotechnology.

=== Science communication ===
On the advice of a speaking coach, she invented the alter-ego "Nanogirl" as a way to overcome her nerves. Initially Dickinson used the name "Nanogirl" to write a science blog, then as it became more popular she started a YouTube channel and began to speak at schools and events. She has regular speaking slots on radio and television and is invited to events such as TED conferences. In December 2016, Dickinson delivered a live, theatrical science experiment show titled "Little Bang, Big Bang" in towns, cities and schools around New Zealand during a 3-week tour of the country.

In 2014, Dickinson won both the Prime Minister's Science Communication Award and the New Zealand Association of Scientists' Science Communicators Award. She was active as a science communicator during the COVID-19 pandemic in New Zealand, including participating in a panel discussion with Prime Minister Jacinda Ardern and Juliet Gerrard, the Prime Minister's Chief Science Advisor.

=== Nanogirl Labs ===
With her husband Joe Davis, Dickinson founded Nanogirl Labs in 2016 as a social enterprise and science education design company dedicated to promoting science, technology, engineering, and mathematics (STEM) education. While the company generated revenue through various educational services and products, it also received external public funding to support its initiatives. The company went into liquidation in 2024 because of financial challenges due to cuts to government funding, sponsorship and the cost of living crisis.

=== Charity work ===
Dickinson co-founded the charity OMGTech in 2014 with Vaughan Rowsell and Rab Heath to provide children of all ages and backgrounds access to learning opportunities about technology. Sessions involve hands-on learning of 3D-printing, coding, robotics and science. The charity also supports teachers in low-decile schools to gain confidence in using technology in their teaching. In October 2016, Dickinson resigned from her position at OMG Tech to concentrate on her Nanogirl activities.

=== Clothes design ===
In 2015, Dickinson collaborated with the New Zealand clothing company Icebreaker, a technical designer and a printer to produce a line of dresses featuring science and technology-related designs.

=== Writer ===
In 2017, Dickinson wrote No.8 Re-Charged, a book about world-changing innovations from New Zealand. In 2018, she wrote The Kitchen Science Cookbook, a book showcasing science experiments that can be done in the kitchen.

== Awards and recognition ==
- Prime Minister's Science Communication Award, 2014
- New Zealand Association of Scientists' Science Communicators Award, 2014
- Sir Peter Blake Leadership, 2015
- Member of the New Zealand Order of Merit (MNZM) for services to science, 2015 Queen's Birthday Honours
- Royal Society of New Zealand's Callaghan Medal, 2015
- New Zealand Women of Influence Award for Innovation and Science, 2016
- One of the Royal Society Te Apārangi's "150 women in 150 words" in 2017, celebrating the contributions of women to knowledge in New Zealand.
