= Ocean Mercier =

New Zealand academic

Ocean Ripeka Mercier
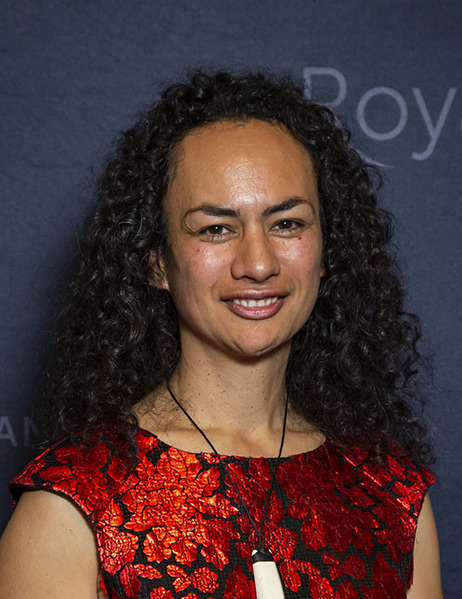
- At 2019 Research Honours Aotearoa
- Education: Victoria University of Wellington
- Awards: Māori Academic Achievement Award in Physics, Inaugural Recipient, 2002; Ako Aotearoa Tertiary Teaching Excellence Award, 2012; New Zealand Association of Scientists Cranwell Medal 2017
- Scientific career
- Fields: Physics, Māori Science
- Thesis: Optical Conductivity of Colossal Magnetoresistance Manganites (2002)
- Doctoral students: Elizabeth Kerekere

Ocean Ripeka Mercier is a New Zealand academic specialising in physics and Māori science.

== Career ==
After a B.Sc. (Hons) Mercier did a PhD at Victoria University of Wellington, in association with Industrial Research Ltd.

Mercier is involved in the field of Māori science, the application of scientific principles and mātauranga Māori to real-world problems. As well as teaching, she presented a television programme on the topic called Project Mātauranga. Mercier is on the editorial board of the MAI Journal.

In 2017 she was awarded the New Zealand Association of Scientists Cranwell Medal for science communication efforts. In 2019 Mercier was awarded the Royal Society Te Apārangi's Callaghan Medal. She was a part of the Imagining Decolonised Cities Team, which won the 2021 Te Rangaunua Hiranga Māori Award, conferred by the Royal Society Te Apārangi.

== Selected publications ==
- Harris, Pauline and Ocean Mercier. Te ara pūtaiao o ngā tūpuna, mō ngā mokopuna: science education and research In Mulholland, M. (2006). State of the Māori nation: Twenty-first-century issues in Aotearoa. Auckland [N.Z.]: Reed.
- Mercier, O. R., Asmar, C. and Page, S. (January 1, 2011). An academic occupation: mobilisation, sit-in, speaking out and confrontation in the experiences of Maori academics. Australian Journal of Indigenous Education, 40, 81-91.
- Mercier, Ocean Ripeka. 'Glocalising' Indigenous Knowledges for the Classroom. In Dei, G. J. S. (2017). Indigenous philosophies and critical education: A reader. New York: Peter Lang.
- Mercier, Ocean Ripeka. What is decolonisation? In Elkington, B. (2020). Imagining decolonisation. Wellington: Bridget Williams Books.
- Mercier, Ocean Ripeka and Beth Ginondidoy Leonard "Our Indigenous brothers and sisters are available for us and we are available for them": non-local relationships nurturing research through an Alaska-Aotearoa online student exchange. In Sumida, H. E. and Martin, N. D. (2020). Indigenous knowledge systems and research methodologies: Local solutions and global opportunities. Toronto: Canadian Knowledge.
- Palmer, S. and Mercier, O. R. (April 3, 2021). Biotechnologies in pest wasp control: taking the sting out of pest management for Māori businesses?. New Genetics and Society, 40, 2, 155-177.

== Personal life ==
Mercier is of Ngāti Porou descent.
