= Henryk Jaskuła =

Polish sailor (1923–2020)

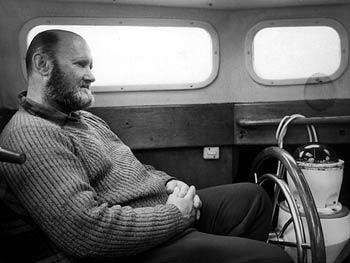
- Henryk Jaskuła in SY Dar Przemyśla.
- Born: 22 October 1923; Radziszów
- Died: 14 May 2020 (aged 96); Przemysl
- Occupation: Yachtsman - Sea Captain

Henryk Jaskuła (22 October 1923 – 14 May 2020) was a yachtsman, sailing captain, and electrical engineer. He was the first Pole to perform a single-handed non-stop circumnavigation of the globe. He achieved it on the yacht Dar Przemyśla.

Jaskuła became the third man to circumnavigate the globe non-stop and single-handed on 20 May 1980, the day he returned to Gdynia.

== Personal life ==
He has two daughters: physicist Lidia Morawska and Aleksandra.

== Orders ==
- Polonia Restituta Officer's Cross

== Bibliography ==
- Henryk Jaskuła - Polish Sailing Encyclopedia (pl.)
