= Natalie Netzler =

New Zealand-Samoan virologist

- Education: University of Waikato; University of New South Wales
- Children: 1
- Awards: Cranwell Medal
- Scientific career
- Fields: Virology
- Workplaces: University of Auckland

Natalie Netzler is a New Zealand Māori-Samoan virologist who works as a senior lecturer at the University of Auckland. She is known for her work with indigenous communities, for which she was jointly awarded the Cranwell Medal in 2023. In December 2025, Netzler received a fellowship to conduct research on traditional indigenous and Samoan medical knowledge.

== Personal life and education ==
Netzler's father Gene was born in Samoa and from the Motoʻotua and Falealili villages, while her mother, Beatrice was from the Ngāti Ruanui and Ngāti Hauā communities. She initially intended to pursue a career in art; however, her parents convinced her to follow a path in STEM instead.

She earned both her Bachelor of Science and Master of Science degrees at the University of Waikato in biology and biochemistry. Shortly after starting her scientific career, she moved to South Korea to teach English. She later worked in France and London, where she met her husband. They then moved to Sydney, where Netzler began studying for her PhD in Virology and Microbiology at the University of New South Wales. While in Australia, she had a daughter. After earning her PhD, she returned to New Zealand.

== Career ==
Between 2000 and 2004, Netzler worked as a Research Assistant at Genesis R&D. She also worked as a Research Scientist at Caldera Health Limited from 2019 to 2022, and as a scientist in the Human Vaccine Development and Production at the BioCell Corporation Limited in 2020.

In November 2023, she and Chris Puli'uvea were awarded the Cranwell Medal in recognition of their communication about the COVID-19 pandemic to Māori communities.

Netzler identified that a traditional Samoan plant used by taulāsea traditional healers proved effective in combating the virus responsible for causing COVID-19. In December 2025, the University of Auckland announced that she was to receive the $1.2 millon Mana Tūānuku Research Leadership Fellowship to conduct further research into indigenous medical knowledge to identify possible new anti-viral treatments, particularly for diseases that disproportionately affect indigenous communities.

She currently works as a Senior Lecturer in Molecular Medicine and Pathology at the University of Auckland Faculty of Medical and Health Sciences.
