= Graham Le Gros =

New Zealand immunologist

Sir Graham Le Gros KNZM
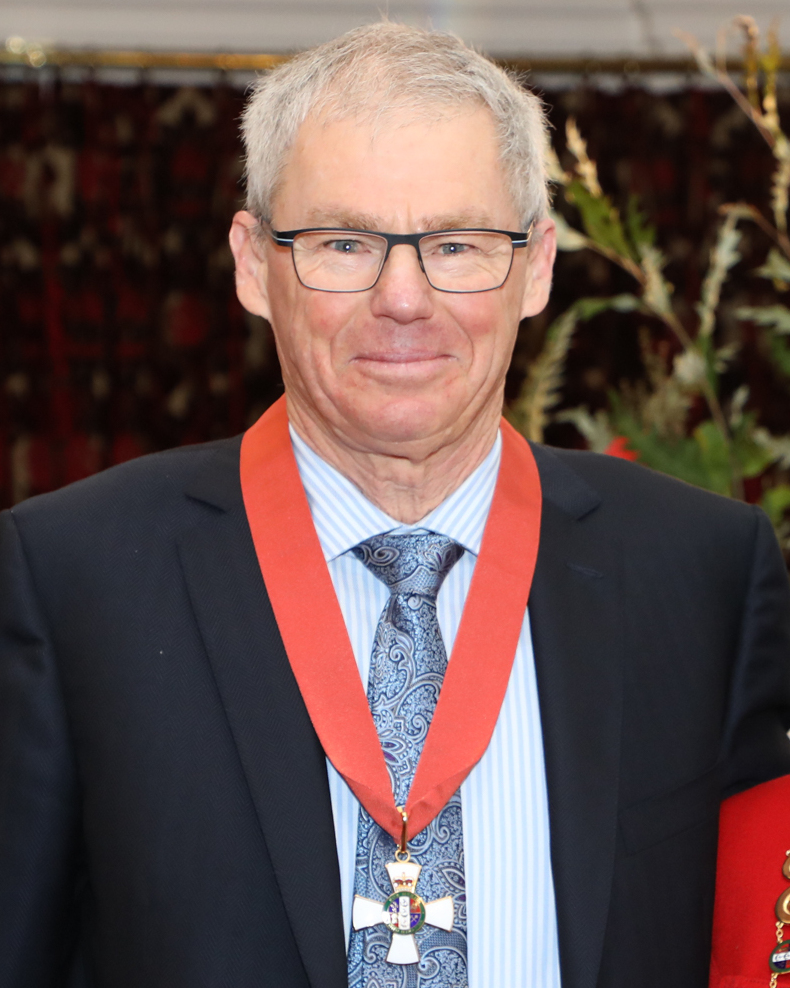
- Le Gros in 2026
- Born: Graham Stephen Le Gros; 1955 or 1956 (age 69–70); Blenheim, New Zealand
- Education: University of Auckland
- Spouse: Franca Ronchese
- Awards: Fellow of the Royal Society of New Zealand (2005)
- Scientific career
- Fields: Immunology
- Workplaces: Malaghan Institute; Victoria University of Wellington
- Thesis: Role of interleukin 2 and interleukin 3 in haemopoiesis (1987)
- Doctoral advisor: Jim Watson

Sir Graham Stephen Le Gros KNZM (born 1955 or 1956) is a New Zealand immunologist. He is a former director of the Malaghan Institute of Medical Research in Wellington, and led its allergic and parasitic diseases programme. In January 2025, he stepped down from the role of director and was appointed deputy chair of the Malaghan Institute's trust board.

== Early life ==
Le Gros was born in Blenheim in 1955 or 1956. During his childhood he moved to Singapore with his father who was in the Air Force. He studied at Massey University and then completed a Diploma of Immunology at the University of Otago.

== Career ==
After completing a PhD in 1987 under Jim Watson at the University of Auckland, titled Role of interleukin 2 and interleukin 3 in haemopoiesis, Le Gros undertook a three-year Fogarty Fellowship at the National Institutes of Health in Washington DC before working for Ciba-Geigy in Switzerland.

In 1990 he published fundamental research – later recognised as a 'Pillar of Immunology' by the Journal of Immunology – with Dr William Paul at the National Institutes of Health and colleagues on the role of IL-4 in Th2 immune responses relevant to allergy, asthma and parasitic diseases.

In 1994 he returned to New Zealand as director of the Malaghan Institute where he also led an active biomedical research programme in allergic and parasitic diseases including running a clinical programme exploring the therapeutic potential of human hookworms. He is a research professor at Victoria University of Wellington.

In 2020, during New Zealand's COVID-19 lockdown, he was a leading voice among New Zealand scientists calling for a national COVID-19 vaccine programme.

Le Gros was a founding director of Vaccine Alliance Aotearoa New Zealand – Ohu Kaupare Huaketo (VAANZ), a collaborative programme with scientists from the Malaghan Institute, University of Otago and Victoria University, which evaluates vaccines and develops local vaccines.

In 2021 he was appointed to the Board of Research for Life.

== Honours and awards ==
In 2005, Le Gros was elected a Fellow of the Royal Society of New Zealand in recognition of his research contributions to the fields of immunology and asthma.

He was awarded the Wellington Medical Research Foundation Gold Medal in 2010 and in 2011 he won the Science and Technology category of the Wellingtonian of the Year Awards for his contribution to medical research in Wellington and New Zealand.

Le Gros was awarded an Honorary Fellowship from the Royal College of Pathologists of Australasia in 2014 and the same year was made a Companion of the New Zealand Order of Merit in the Queen's Birthday Honours.

In 2016 he received the Sir Geoffrey Peren Award, the Distinguished Alumni Award 2016 by Massey University.

In 2017 Le Gros was named a Paul Harris Fellow by the Rotary Foundation of Rotary International in appreciation of tangible and significant assistance given for the furtherance of better understanding and friendly relations among peoples of the world.

He was named a 2021 Kea World Class New Zealander acknowledging his "stellar career as a world-leading immunologist, seeking to harness the power of the human immune system to improve human health."

In the 2026 New Year Honours, Le Gros was promoted to Knight Companion of the New Zealand Order of Merit, for services to medical science.

== Personal life ==
Le Gros is married to Professor Franca Ronchese, who leads the Ronchese Lab at the Malaghan Institute.

== Selected publications ==
- Filbey KJ, Mehta PH, Meijlink KJ, Pellefigues C, Schmidt AJ, Le Gros G (2020). The Gastrointestinal Helminth Heligmosomoides bakeri Suppresses Inflammation in a Model of Contact Hypersensitivity. Front Immunol. 11:950
- Ussher JE, Le Gros G, Quiñones-Mateu ME, Gulab SA, Yiannoutsos M (2020). The case for New Zealand to have its own COVID-19 vaccine programme. N Z Med J. 133(1513):112–115
- Bouchery T, Le Gros G, Harris N(2019) ILC2s-Trailblazers in the Host Response Against Intestinal Helminths. Front Immunol 10:623
- Filbey K, Camberis M, Chandler J, Turner R, Kettle A, Eichenberger R, Giacomin P, Le Gros G (2019) Intestinal helminth infection promotes IL-5- and CD4+ T cell-dependent immunity in the lung against migrating parasites. Mucusal Immunology 12(2):352–362
