= Susan Geertshuis =

English-New Zealand academic

Susan A. Geertshuis
- Education: University of Nottingham
- Scientific career
- Fields: Cognitive psychology, workplace learning
- Workplaces: University of Wales Bangor, University of Northampton, University of Auckland

Susan A. Geertshuis is an English-New Zealand academic psychologist. She is currently a full professor at the University of Auckland.

== Academic career ==
After a PhD at the University of Nottingham, she worked at the University of Wales Bangor and the University of Northampton, before moving to the University of Auckland, rising to full professor.

== Selected works ==
- Geertshuis, Susan, Mary Holmes, Harry Geertshuis, David Clancy, and Amanda Bristol. "Evaluation of workplace learning." Journal of Workplace Learning 14, no. 1 (2002): 11–18.
- Geertshuis, Susan A., Rachel L. Morrison, and Helena D. Cooper-Thomas. "It's not what you say, it's the way that you say it: The mediating effect of upward influencing communications on the relationship between leader-member exchange and performance ratings." International Journal of Business Communication 52, no. 2 (2015): 228–245.
- Sambrook, Sally, Susan Geertshuis, and David Cheseldine. "Developing a quality assurance system for computer-based learning materials: Problems and issues." Assessment & Evaluation in Higher Education 26, no. 5 (2001): 417–426.
- Geertshuis, Susan A., and John A. Fazey. "Approaches to learning in the workplace." Journal of Workplace Learning 18, no. 1 (2006): 55–65.
- Geertshuis, Susan. "Improving decision making for sustainability: a case study from New Zealand." International Journal of Sustainability in Higher Education 10, no. 4 (2009): 379–389.
