= David Schiel =

American marine ecologist in New Zealand

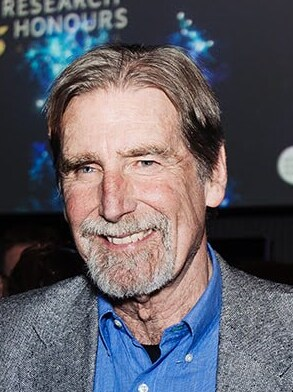
Schiel in 2025

David Schiel is a marine ecologist and biologist from New Zealand. He studied at the University of Auckland and was awarded a PhD in 1980. The title of his doctoral thesis was A demographic and experimental evaluation of plant and herbivore interactions in subtidal algal stands. He is currently a Distinguished Professor of University of Canterbury.
