= Malaghan Institute of Medical Research =

Independent biomedical research institute in Wellington, New Zealand

Coordinates: 41.291065°S 174.768376°E

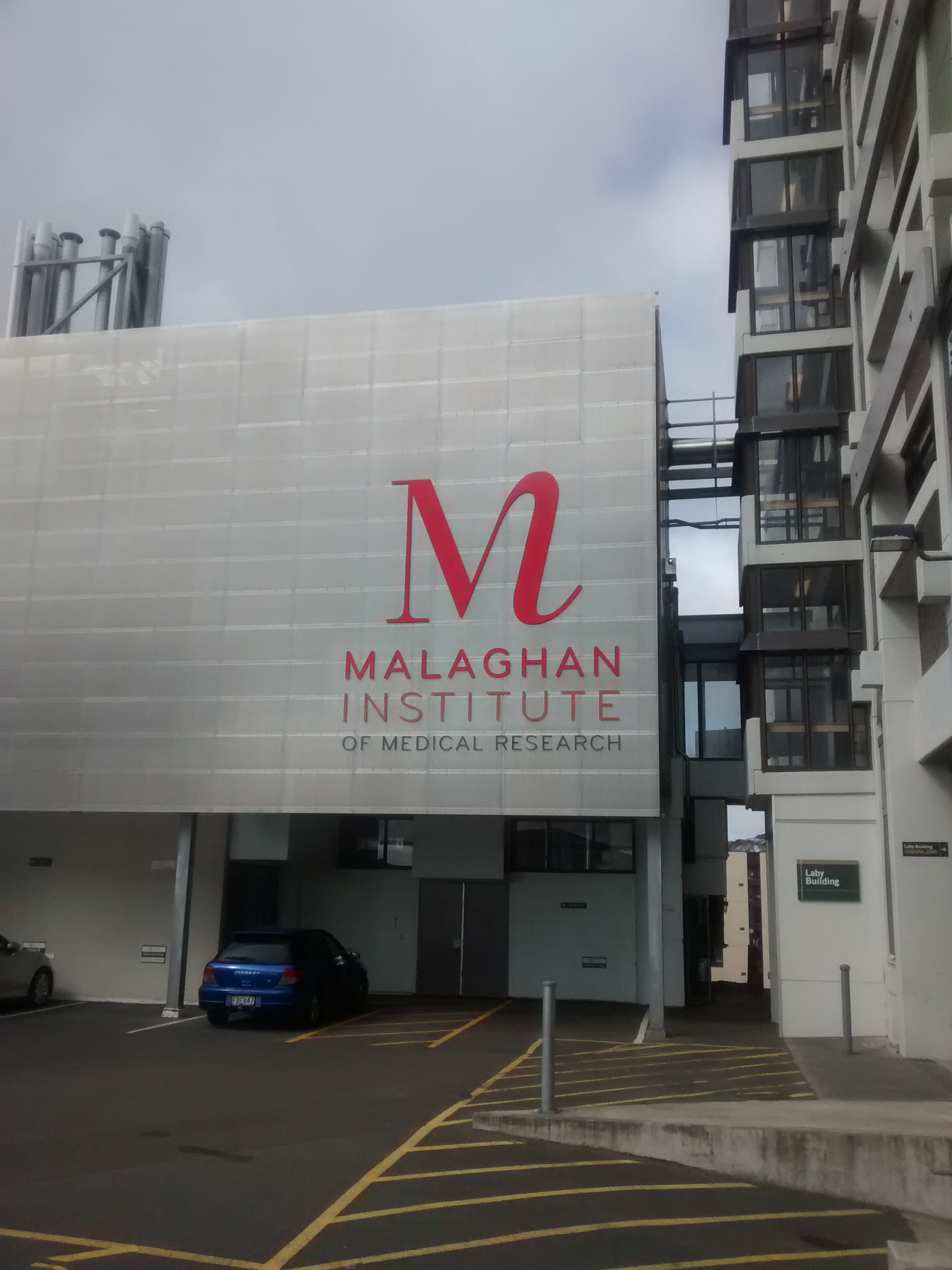

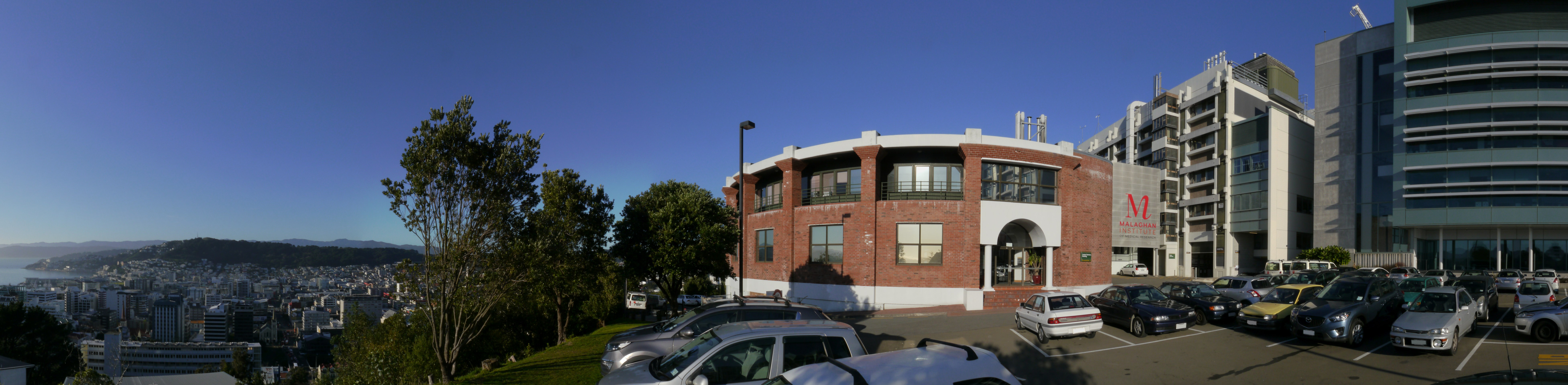

The Malaghan Institute of Medical Research is an independent biomedical research institute based in Wellington, New Zealand. The Malaghan Institute specialises in the immune system, and how it can be harnessed to improve human health. Its key areas of research and discovery are cancer, allergic and inflammatory diseases, and infectious disease. In 2019, the institute began New Zealand's first clinical trial of CAR T-cell therapy, trialling a third-generation CAR T-cell therapy.

The concept of a Wellington-based, independent medical research institute was first proposed in the early 1960s. At that time, relatively little medical research was carried out in New Zealand due to a lack of facilities and support by hospital boards. Using funds from a trust established by the Wellington Medical Research Foundation and the Wellington Division of the Cancer Society, the Wellington Cancer and Medical Research Institute was opened on 26 July 1979, in rented premises in the Wellington School of Medicine. In 1986, the name of the Institute was changed to the Malaghan Institute of Medical Research in recognition of the generous support by Len Malaghan, the co-founder of Tip Top Ice Cream Ltd (later General Foods) and his wife Ann, whose gift of 100,000 shares in the company seeded the Institute. Len died of cancer in 1967 at the relatively young age of 61.

The institute is a registered charity, relying on support from the community, the corporate sector and contestable grants.

In 2004 the institute relocated to a purpose-built facility at Victoria University of Wellington.

The founding director was Dr William Stehbens. Professor Graham Le Gros served as director from 1994 to 2024. The current director is Professor Kjesten Wiig, a neuroscientist whose career has spanned senior leadership roles in academia, industry and government, all with a focus on advancing science and innovation.

The institute won the supreme The Dominion Post Gold Award for 2014, recognising its 30-year history of finding better treatments for cancer, asthma and allergies.

== Notable people connected to the Malaghan ==
- Kjesten Wiig
- Graham Le Gros
- Franca Ronchese
- Mike Berridge
- Len Malaghan
- Dame Patsy Reddy
- Sir Ashley Bloomfield
- Rebecca Grainger, professor of rheumatology at University of Otago
