= Environment International =

Scientific journal

- Discipline: Environmental science and health
- Language: English
- Edited by: Frederic Coulon, Adrian Covaci, Thanh Huong (Helen) Nguyen, Mark J. Nieuwenhuijsen

Publication details
- History: 1978-present
- Publisher: Elsevier
- Frequency: Monthly
- Open access: Yes
- License: CC BY
- Impact factor: 10.3 (2023)

Standard abbreviations
- ISO 4: Environ. Int.

Indexing
- CODEN: ENVIDV
- ISSN: 0160-4120 (print); 1873-6750 (web)
- LCCN: 81649513
- OCLC no.: 04079573

Links
- Journal homepage; Online archive

Environment International is a monthly peer-reviewed open-access scientific journal covering research in environmental science and environmental health. It was established in 1978 and is published by Elsevier.

== Editors-in-chief ==
The following persons are editors-in-chief:

- Frederic Coulon (Cranfield University)
- Adrian Covaci (University of Antwerp)
- Thanh Huong (Helen) Nguyen (University of Illinois Urbana-Champaign)
- Mark Nieuwenhuijsen (Barcelona Institute for Global Health)

== Abstracting and indexing ==
The journal is abstracted and indexed in:

- Biological Abstracts
- BIOSIS Previews
- Current Contents/Agriculture, Biology & Environmental Sciences
- Directory of Open Access Journals
- EBSCO databases
- Ei Compendex
- Embase
- GEOBASE
- Index Medicus/MEDLINE/PubMed
- Science Citation Index Expanded
- Scopus
- The Zoological Record

According to the Journal Citation Reports, the journal has a 2023 impact factor of 10.3.

== See also ==
- Environment and Behavior
- Environmental Health Perspectives
- Journal of Exposure Science and Environmental Epidemiology
- Science of the Total Environment
