= Mohsen Naghavi =

Iranian-American researcher

- محسن نقوی
- Education: University of Tehran (PhD, MD, MPH)
- Scientific career
- Institutions: University of Washington

Mohsen Naghavi (Persian: محسن نقوی) is an Iranian-American researcher and Professor of Health Metrics Sciences at the University of Washington. He is one of the top highly cited researchers (h>100) according to webometrics.
