= Jose L. Jimenez (chemist) =

Spanish–American chemist

- Born: Zaragoza, Spain

Academic background
- Education: BS, mechanical engineering, MS, mechanical engineering, 1993, University of Zaragoza and Université de Technologie de Compiègne; PhD, mechanical engineering, 1999, Massachusetts Institute of Technology
- Thesis: Understanding and quantifying motor vehicle emissions with vehicle specific power and TILDAS remote sensing (1999)

José Luis Jiménez-Palacios is a Spanish–American chemist and engineer. As a professor of chemistry at the University of Colorado Boulder, Jimenez contributed to the establishment of the Aerodyne Aerosol Mass Spectrometer, an instrument for real-time analysis of aerosol size and composition.

During the COVID-19 pandemic, Jimenez was one of over 200 experts in multiple scientific fields who signed an open letter to the World Health Organization urging them to acknowledge that airborne aerosols play an important role in transmitting COVID-19. Later, he created a Google Doc to educate the public about airborne coronavirus transmission and combat misinformation, and authored multiple scientific papers on the topic.

== Early life and education ==
Jimenez was born and raised in Zaragoza, Spain. He completed a double master's degree in mechanical engineering from the University of Zaragoza and the Université de Technologie de Compiègne before moving to the United States and enrolling at the Massachusetts Institute of Technology for his PhD.

== Career ==
During his early tenure at the University of Colorado Boulder, Jimenez contributed to the establishment of the Aerodyne Aerosol Mass Spectrometer, an instrument for real-time analysis of aerosol size and composition. In 2006, he and Rainer Volkamer were co-lead authors on a study showing a link between human activities and a type of particulate pollutants. The study was conducted in the Mexico City metropolitan area in 2003. As an associate professor of chemistry and biochemistry at the University of Colorado Boulder, he was named the recipient of the 2010 Rosenstiel Award for his "groundbreaking measurement techniques to atmospheric science, addressing critical questions regarding aerosols in our environment and their role in climate change and air quality." Two years later, Jimenez received a 2012 Atmospheric Sciences Ascent Award "for the development and utilization of innovative measurement technology to address critical aspects relating to the sources, transformations, and environmental fates of fine atmospheric particles."

His research into aerosols earned him elections as Fellow of the American Association for Aerosol Research and the American Geophysical Union. He has been recognized by the firm Clarivate Analytics as a Highly Cited Researcher for each year between 2014 and 2022 as being in the top one percent of citations for the geosciences field. During the COVID-19 pandemic, Jimenez was one of 239 experts in multiple scientific fields who signed an open letter to the World Health Organization urging them to acknowledge that airborne aerosols play an important role in transmitting COVID-19. Later, he created a Google Doc to educate the public about airborne coronavirus transmission and combat misinformation. He participated in a non-partisan panel that included 386 multidisciplinary contributors from 112+ countries and published specific statements and recommendations to end COVID-19 as a public health threat in the journal Nature (November 2022).
