= Lynn McBain =

Professor of primary healthcare and general practice

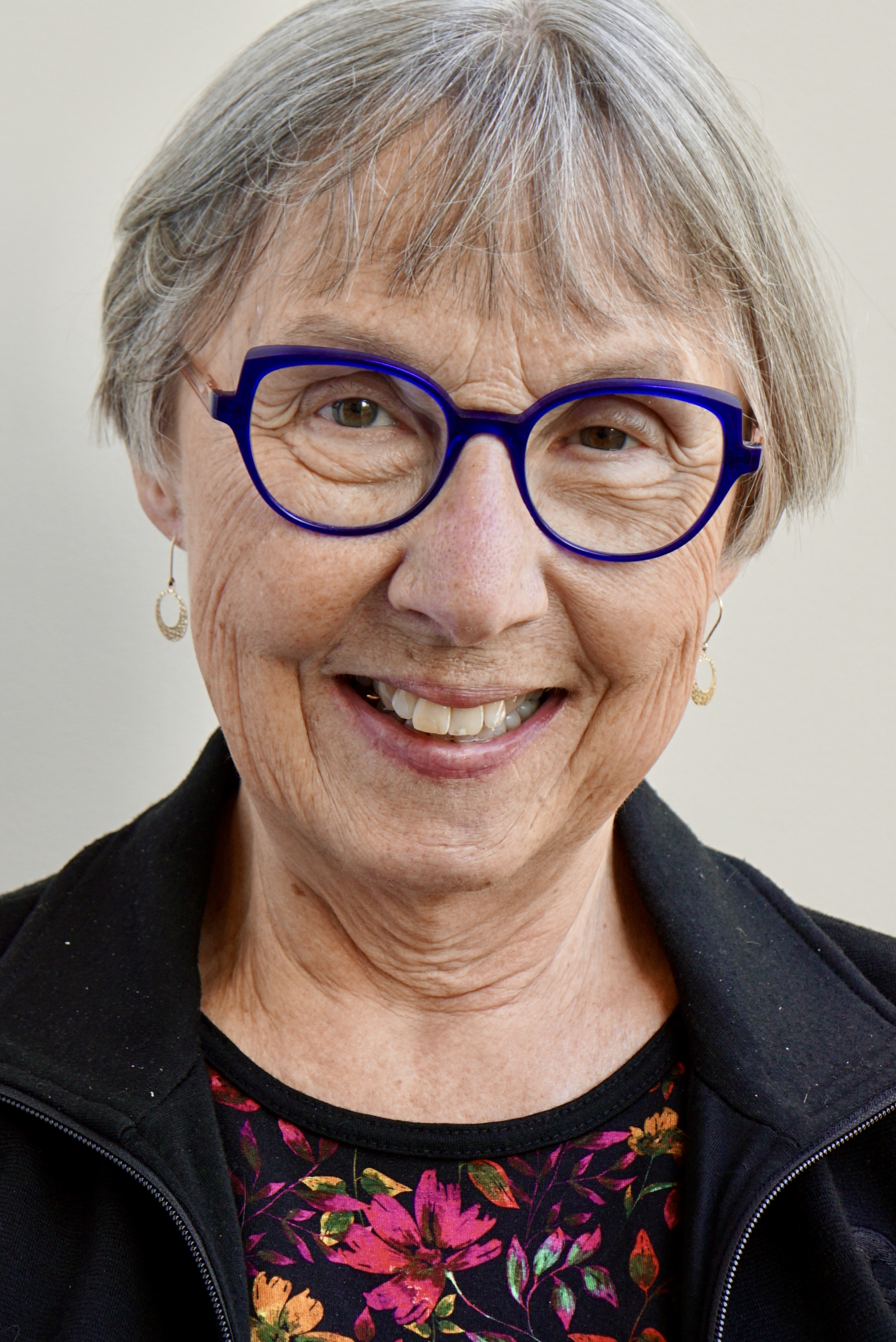

Academic background
- Education: Dalhousie University

Lynn Carol McBain is a Canadian–New Zealand academic and specialist general practitioner, and is a full professor at the University of Otago, specialising in research on medical education, and primary health services. She is a Distinguished Fellow of the Royal New Zealand College of General Practitioners.

== Academic career ==
McBain completed her medical training at Dalhousie University in Nova Scotia. McBain then moved to New Zealand, where she initially worked as a house surgeon at Hāwera, and then worked in general practice at the Brooklyn Medical Centre in Wellington from the early 1990s until 2022. She continues to provide locum cover. McBain found she enjoyed teaching medical students that came to the medical centre, and she joined the faculty of the University of Otago in 1995 as a part time lecturer, rising to associate professor in 2018 and full professor in 2024. McBain has been the head of the Department of Primary Health Care and General Practice since 2017, and was appointed Deputy Dean at the University of Otago Wellington campus in 2022.

McBain's research focus cover both medical education and clinical practice. She is interested in how health services can be evaluated, and those findings put into practice in primary care, particularly in relation to mental health care and oral health in primary settings. She has researched the introduction of the HPV-based cervical cancer screening service in New Zealand, and is part of research on multimorbidity in the Ageing Well National Science Challenge. Her educational research interests have led her to investigate topics such as the teaching of consultation skills and physical examination skills, and care in chronic disease and palliative medicine.

McBain was appointed a Distinguished Fellow of the Royal New Zealand College of General Practitioners in 2011. She has served as the chair of the New Zealand Education Council's Impairment Committee, and convenor of the New Zealand Medical Council's Professional Conduct Committee. McBain has been director and deputy chair of Tū Ora Compass Health, a North Island primary health organisation.

== Selected works ==
- Sheridan, Nicolette; Hoare, Karen; Carryer, Jenny; Mills, Jane; Hewitt, Sarah; Love, Tom; Kenealy, Timothy; The Primary Care Models Study Group; Stokes, Tim; Aguirre-Duarte, Nelson; Arroll, Bruce; Atmore, Carol; Crampton, Peter; Dowell, Anthony; Fishman, Tana (4 October 2024). "Nurses' work in relation to patient health outcomes: an observational study comparing models of primary care". International Journal for Equity in Health. 23 (1): 198. doi:10.1186/s12939-024-02288-z. ISSN 1475-9276. PMC 11451150. PMID 39367386.
- Sykes, Peter; Innes, Carrie; Bell, Rebecca; Nip, Janine; McMenamin, John; McBain, Lynn; Hudson, Ben; Gibson, Melanie; Te Whaiti, Sarah; Tino, Alexandria; Williman, Jonathan; Miller, Andrew; Lawton, Beverley (31 March 2025). "Human Papillomavirus ( HPV ) Screening With Universal Access to Vaginal Self-Testing: Outcomes of an Implementation Trial". BJOG: An International Journal of Obstetrics & Gynaecology. 132 (9): 1240–1249. doi:10.1111/1471-0528.18159. ISSN 1470-0328. PMC 12232538. PMID 40162498.
- Sheridan, Nicolette; Hoare, Karen; Carryer, Jenny; Mills, Jane; Hewitt, Sarah; Love, Tom; Kenealy, Timothy; The Primary Care Models Study Group; Stokes, Tim; Aguirre-Duarte, Nelson; Arroll, Bruce; Atmore, Carol; Crampton, Peter; Dowell, Anthony; Fishman, Tana (4 October 2024). "Nurses' work in relation to patient health outcomes: an observational study comparing models of primary care". International Journal for Equity in Health. 23 (1): 198. doi:10.1186/s12939-024-02288-z. ISSN 1475-9276. PMC 11451150. PMID 39367386.
- Bushnell, John Alexander; Deborah McLeod; Anthony Dowell; Clare Salmond; Stella Ramage; Collings, Catherine Diane; Pete Ellis; Marjan Kljakovic; McBain, Lynn Carol; MaGPIe Research Group (2005). "The treatment of common mental health problems in general practice". Family Practice. 23 (1): 53–59. doi:10.1093/fampra/cmi097. PMID 16303773. Wikidata Q51923974.
- John Bushnell; Deborah McLeod; Anthony Dowell; et al. (2005). "Do patients want to disclose psychological problems to GPs?". Family Practice. 22 (6): 631–637. doi:10.1093/fampra/cmi080. PMID 16055471. Wikidata Q51927494.
- Eileen McKinlay; Libby Plumridge; McBain, Lynn Carol; Deborah McLeod; Pullon, Susan; Selina Brown (2005). ""What sort of health promotion are you talking about?": a discourse analysis of the talk of general practitioners". Social Science & Medicine. 60 (5): 1099–1106. doi:10.1016/j.socscimed.2004.06.041. PMID 15589677. Wikidata Q81121164.
- McBain, Lynn Carol; Donnelly, Sinéad; Hilder, Jo; Clare O'Leary; McKinlay, Eileen (2015). ""I wanted to communicate my feelings freely": a descriptive study of creative responses to enhance reflection in palliative medicine education". BMC Medical Education. 15: 180. doi:10.1186/s12909-015-0465-4. PMC 4619026. PMID 26498341. Wikidata Q30380638.
- Jayden MacRae; Tom Love; Baker, Michael George; Anthony Dowell; Matthew Carnachan; Stubbe, Maria; McBain, Lynn Carol (2015). "Identifying influenza-like illness presentation from unstructured general practice clinical narrative using a text classifier rule-based expert system versus a clinical expert". BMC Medical Informatics and Decision Making. 15: 78. doi:10.1186/s12911-015-0201-3. PMC 4596422. PMID 26445235. Wikidata Q30380065.
- E. McKinlay; S. Garrett; L. McBain; T. Dowell; Collings, Catherine Diane; J. Stanley (2011). "New Zealand general practice nurses' roles in mental health care". International Nursing Review. 58 (2): 225–233. doi:10.1111/j.1466-7657.2010.00859.x. PMID 21554297. Wikidata Q50803180.
- Eileen McKinlay; McBain, Lynn Carol (2007). "Evaluation of the Palliative Care Partnership: a New Zealand solution to the provision of integrated palliative care". The New Zealand Medical Journal. 120 (1263): U2745. PMID 17972965. Wikidata Q47571183.
