= Chris Jackson (oncologist) =

New Zealand oncologist

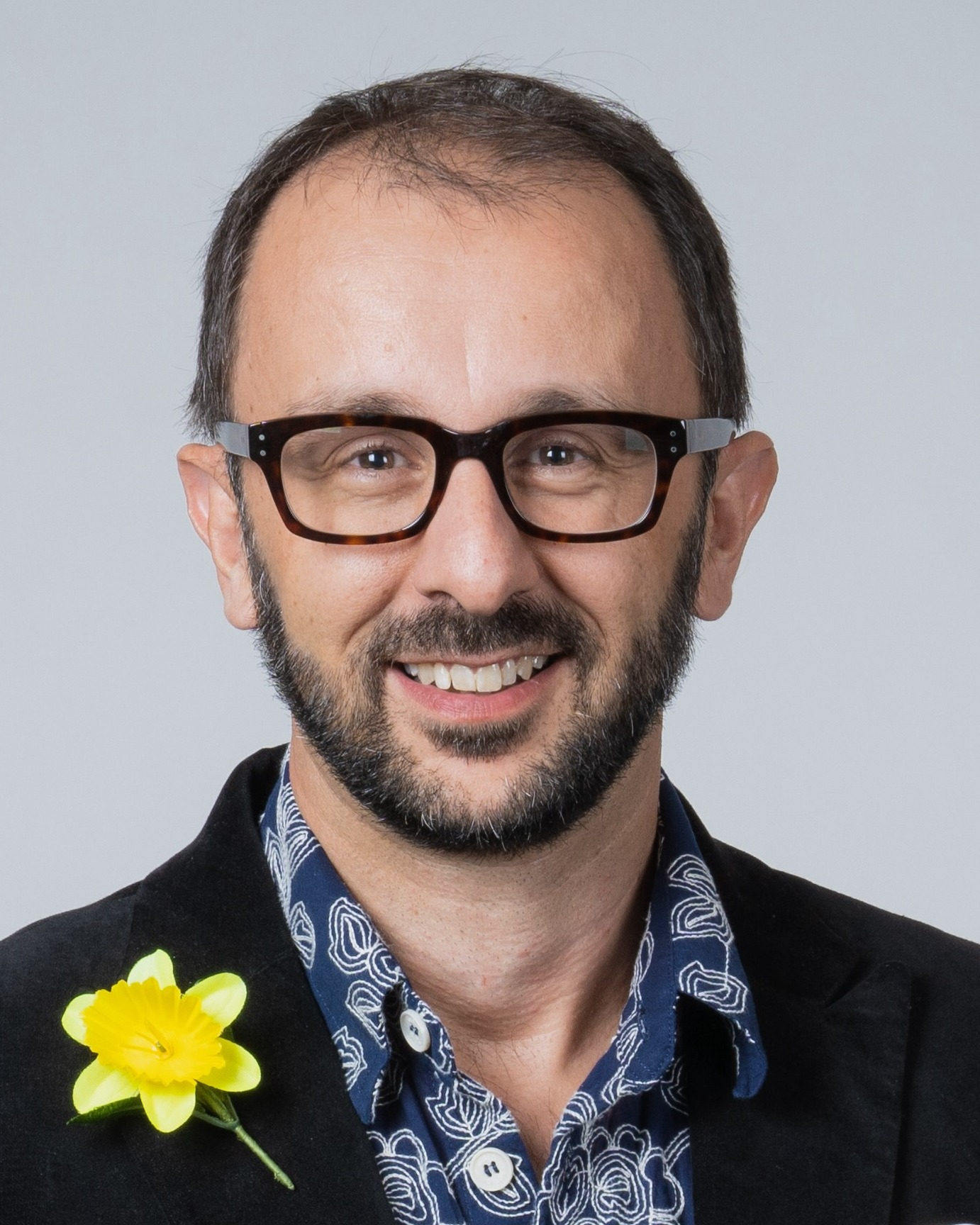
- Jackson in 2023
- Born: Oamaru, New Zealand
- Education: University of Otago
- Spouse: Rachel Brooking
- Medical career
- Institutions: Royal Marsden Hospital; Dunedin Hospital; Te Whatu Ora
- Research: Medical oncology; melanoma; gastrointestinal cancer

Christopher Glyn Charles Alexander Jackson is a New Zealand medical oncologist, who specialises in gastrointestinal cancers and melanoma. He is professor of oncology at the University of Otago, and consultant oncologist at Dunedin Hospital. Jackson is the founder of Mercy Cancer Care, and co-leader of the Cancer National Clinical Network for Health New Zealand Te Whatu Ora. His advocacy led to the creation of the national cancer agency Te Aho o Te Kahu, and he serves on its advisory council. He is the former medical director of the Cancer Society of New Zealand.

== Early life and education ==
Jackson was born and grew up in Oamaru, and is from a family of teachers. He decided as a teenager that he wanted to become a doctor. He attended Waitaki Boys' High School and then studied medicine at the University of Otago, graduating with Bachelor of Medicine and Bachelor of Surgery degrees in 2000. After graduating, Jackson became interested in palliative care.

== Career ==
Jackson is a medical oncologist, specialising in gastrointestinal cancer, and melanoma. He trained in New Zealand and then for two years at the Royal Marsden Hospital in London, and is now a consultant medical oncologist at Dunedin Hospital. Jackson became a Fellow of the Royal Australasian College of Physicians in 2008. Jackson was promoted to full professor at the University of Otago in 2022, and was appointed deputy dean of the Dunedin School of Medicine in 2025.

Jackson co-founded Mercy Cancer Care at Mercy Hospital in Dunedin in 2011, as a unit providing specialist oncology across the lower South Island.

Jackson researches and writes on health and cancer policy and health services. He published an editorial for the British Medical Journal on the effects of cancer reforms in the United Kingdom. His research on bowel cancer treatment variations in New Zealand led to the development of national standards in cancer care and a cancer quality improvement plan. Jackson's involvement in an international research project revealed worse cancer outcomes in New Zealand, leading to a national conversation on cancer care and drug availability. Jackson is also involved in research developing a new oral chemotherapy tablet.

In 2015, Jackson was appointed medical director of the Cancer Society of New Zealand. During his tenure, Jackson appeared on news and current affairs programmes discussing the "postcode lottery" of cancer care and New Zealand's poor performance in cancer care compared to Australia. Jackson called for Pharmac to establish an early-access scheme for medicines for cancer patients, and was instrumental in obtaining new drugs for melanoma patients, in particular the immunotherapy drug pembrolizumab (also known as Keytruda). Alongside Diana Sarfati and cancer patient Blair Vining, Jackson ran a campaign for a national cancer agency, which resulted in the publication of a ten-year Cancer Action Plan, and the establishment of national cancer agency Te Aho o Te Kahu in 2019 to enact that plan. Jackson stepped down from his role in the Cancer Society in 2021 when his wife was elected as an MP.

Jackson was chair of the South Island Bowel Cancer and the Colorectal Cancer Tumour Standards working groups, and is a member of the National Bowel Cancer Work group. He is on the executive committee of the New Zealand Society of Oncology. In 2024, he was also appointed as inaugural co-lead for cancer on Health New Zealand's National Clinical Network, which works to improve access to cancer services across the country.

Internationally, Jackson was elected to the board of the Union for International Cancer Control (UICC) in 2024, to serve a two-year term. He served on the Asia Pacific Regional Council of the American Society of Clinical Oncology. He is on the programme board for the International Cancer Benchmarking Project, which compares cancer survival statistics internationally. He is also a founding member of Common Sense Oncology, a global movement initiated in Canada in 2023 which aims to "ensure patients have access to cancer treatments that provide meaningful improvements in outcomes that matter irrespective of where they live or their health system".

Jackson is on the editorial board of the Journal of Global Oncology. He was recognized as one of the 100 most influential people in oncology for 2025.

In 2026, Jackson was awarded the Beaven Medal by the Health Research Council of New Zealand.

== Personal life ==
Jackson is married to Rachel Brooking, who was elected a list MP for Labour in 2020 general election and MP for Dunedin in 2023. They have three children.

== Selected works ==
- Booth, Christopher; Sengar, Manju; Goodman, Aaron; et al. (2023). "Common Sense Oncology: outcomes that matter". The Lancet Oncology. 24 (8): 833–835. doi:10.1016/s1470-2045(23)00319-4. PMID 37467768. Wikidata Q136214633.
- Walker, Simon; Egan, Richard; Young, Jessica; Jaye, Chrystal; Jackson, Christopher Glyn Charles Alexander (2019). "A citizens' jury on euthanasia/assisted dying: Does informed deliberation change people's views?". Health Expectations. 23 (2): 388–395. doi:10.1111/hex.13008. PMC 7104650. PMID 31820555. Wikidata Q91837574.
- Jackson, Christopher Glyn Charles Alexander; Bissett, Ian Peter; Macfarlane, Scott Duncan; Costello, Shaun (2020). "Improving cancer services and survival in New Zealand". Journal of Cancer Policy. 23 100216. doi:10.1016/j.jcpo.2020.100216. Wikidata Q126385364.
- Sarfati, Diana; Macfarlane, Scott Duncan; Bissett, Ian Peter; et al. (2019). "Cancer Care at a Crossroads: time to make a choice". The New Zealand Medical Journal. 132 (1493): 6–11. PMID 30973854. Wikidata Q93025664.
- Sarfati, Diana; Jackson, Christopher Glyn Charles Alexander (2018). "Cancer inequalities endure despite NHS reforms". The BMJ. 360: k989. doi:10.1136/bmj.k989. PMID 29540364. Wikidata Q52655553.
- Jackson, Christopher Glyn Charles Alexander; Hung, C; Segelov, Eva; et al. (2021). "Oral paclitaxel with encequidar compared to intravenous paclitaxel in patients with advanced cancer: a randomised crossover pharmacokinetic study". British Journal of Clinical Pharmacology. 87 (12): 4670–4680. doi:10.22541/au.160978542.20993766/v1. Wikidata Q135278018.
- Jackson, Christopher Glyn Charles Alexander; Deva, Sanjeev; Bayston, Katherine Francis; et al. (2018). "An open-label, randomized cross-over bioavailability and extension study of oral paclitaxel and HM30181 compared with weekly intravenous (IV) paclitaxel in patients with advanced solid tumours". Journal of Clinical Oncology. 36 (15_suppl): 2569–2569. doi:10.1200/jco.2018.36.15_suppl.2569. Wikidata Q136214625.
