= Sinéad Donnelly =

Irish professor of palliative medicine

Academic background
- Education: University of Otago
- Thesis: The experiences of ethical issues at the end of life for first and second year doctors (2020)
- Academic advisors: Lynley Anderson, Simon Walker

Sinéad Donnelly (also Ni Dhonnghaile) is an Irish–New Zealand academic, and is a full professor at the University of Otago, specialising in palliative care.

== Academic career ==
Donnelly was born in Ireland, and trained there as a palliative and general medicine physician. Her father was a physician, and her whole family trained in health care. Donnelly trained with Ireland's first palliative medicine specialists Dr Michael Kearney and Professor Tony O’Brien.

Donnelly completed a Master of Health Science in 2020 titled The experiences of ethical issues at the end of life for first and second year doctors at the University of Otago. Donnelly then completed a research PhD at the Cleveland Clinic in America. She was the first Irish doctor to be awarded a doctorate for research on palliative medicine. Donnelly joined the faculty of the University of Otago in Wellington in 2009, and works at Wellington Hospital. She was appointed associate professor in 2020 and full professor in 2024.

Donnelly is chair of the network Hospital Palliative Care Aotearoa, and a founding member of the Palliative Care Collaborative Aotearoa, which advocates for "better, more equitable palliative care available across New Zealand". Donnelly has produced six documentaries about social justice issues and palliative care, some of which have been shown on television and used in medical training. In 2023 her documentary Te Whakahemohemo, The Way We Care, showed stories of dying patients and their carers, and the healthcare professionals around them. It premiered at the Roxy Cinema in Miramar, Wellington, and was shown on Maori TV.

== Selected works ==
- Donnelly, Sinead (30 June 2024). "Dr Sinead Donnelly: Palliative medicine uses morphine with care". NZ Herald.
- C A MacRae; N Ghaisas; S Kass; Donnelly, Sinéad; C T Basson; Watkins, Hugh; R Anan; L H Thierfelder; K McGarry; E Rowland (1995). "Familial Hypertrophic cardiomyopathy with Wolff-Parkinson-White syndrome maps to a locus on chromosome 7q3". Journal of Clinical Investigation. 96 (3): 1216–20. doi:10.1172/jci118154. PMC 185741. PMID 7657794. Wikidata Q24679142.
- David J Meagher; Maria Moran; Bangaru Raju; Dympna Gibbons; Donnelly, Sinéad; Jean Saunders; Paula T Trzepacz (2007). "Phenomenology of delirium. Assessment of 100 adult cases using standardised measures". British Journal of Psychiatry. 190: 135–141. doi:10.1192/bjp.bp.106.023911. PMID 17267930. Wikidata Q48478872.
- Donnelly, Sinéad; Mellar P Davis; Declan Walsh; Michael Naughton; World Health Organization (2002). "Morphine in cancer pain management: a practical guide". Supportive Care in Cancer. 10 (1): 13–35. doi:10.1007/s005200100274. PMID 11777184. Wikidata Q34484587.
- Donnelly, Sinéad (2020). "The Elderly & COVID-19: Cocooning or Culling: - the choice is ours". QJM. doi:10.1093/qjmed/hcaa145. PMC 7197567. PMID 32343807. Wikidata Q94446009.
