= University of Otago, Wellington =

New Zealand health sciences school

Coordinates: 41.30990°S 174.78077°E

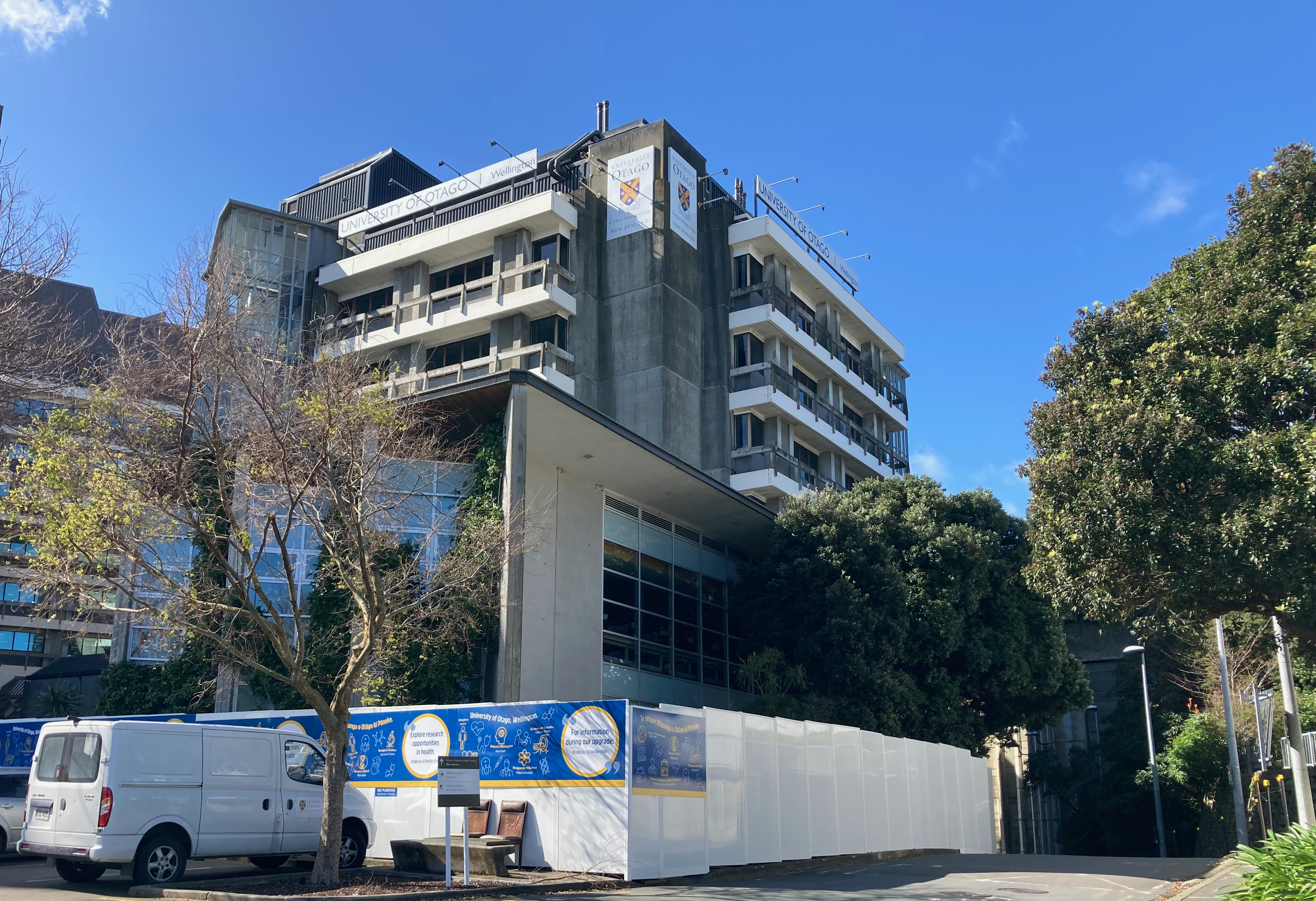
University of Otago in Wellington, 2022

The University of Otago, Wellington is one of seven component schools that make up the University of Otago Division of Health Sciences. All University of Otago medical students who gain entry after a competitive Health Sciences First Year programme, or who gain graduate entry, spend their second and third years studying in Dunedin in a programme called Early Learning in Medicine (ELM), which is jointly taught by the Otago Medical School and the School of Biomedical Sciences. In their fourth, fifth, and sixth years, medical students study at one of three clinical schools: either Otago Medical School or the University of Otago, Christchurch or the University of Otago, Wellington.

== History ==
From the early 1920s, University of Otago students could complete their last year of training at hospitals in either Auckland, Christchurch, or Wellington as well as Dunedin. In 1926 Wellington Hospital became a recognised teaching hospital and was established as a branch faculty in 1937. In the 1960s there was debate about whether there should be a full medical school attached to Victoria University or a University of Otago clinical school; in 1971 it was decided that a clinical school be established. With the opening of the Academic block in Mein St in 1977 the clinical school was the forerunner to the University of Otago, Wellington. Fifty two fourth-year students entered the school in 1977.

In 2021 the campus building, adjacent to Wellington Regional Hospital, was closed due to earthquake concerns, requiring the staff to work from home or at other locations.

== Departments ==
The University of Otago, Wellington is structured into nine academic departments:

- Medicine
- Obstetrics, Gynaecology and Women's Health
- Paediatrics
- Pathology and Molecular Medicine
- Primary Health Care and General Practice
- Psychological Medicine
- Public Health
- Radiation Therapy
- Surgery and Anaesthesia.

The Wellington Medical and Health Sciences Library provides library services to staff and students of the university and staff of Te Whatu Ora Capital Coast and Hutt Valley (formerly Capital & Coast District Health Board).

Additional health sciences disciplines are taught in Dunedin and Christchurch.

== Notable academics and staff ==
- Michael Baker
- Sinéad Donnelly
- Dawn Elder
- Rebecca Grainger
- Keri Lawson-Te Aho
- Lynn McBain
- Tom O'Donnell (physician)
- Ian Prior (epidemiologist)
- Sue Pullon
- Lynette Sadleir
- Diana Sarfati
- Dianne Sika–Paotonu
- Ayesha Verrall
