= University of Otago School of Medicine =

The University of Otago maintains three schools of medicine. The term "University of Otago School of Medicine" would normally refer to the medical school at its main campus:

- University of Otago Dunedin School of Medicine

It may, however, also refer to either of the university's other two medical campuses:

- University of Otago Christchurch School of Medicine
- University of Otago Wellington School of Medicine
