= Cancer Control Agency =

New Zealand departmental agency

The Cancer Control Agency (Te Aho o Te Kahu) is a departmental agency of the New Zealand Ministry of Health that reports to the Minister of Health. The Agency was established in 2019 by the Sixth Labour Government to improve the prevention and detection of cancer in New Zealand.

== Leadership and mandate ==
The Cancer Control Agency is headed by a chief executive who reports to the Minister of Health. It has a national office in the capital Wellington and four regional hubs. The Agency's functions and responsibilities include providing national leadership in cancer control, providing cancer-related policy advice to the New Zealand government, and implementing the 2019-2029 Cancer Action Plan.

On 19 June 2019, the agency was gifted its Māori name Te Aho o te Kahu by Dame Naida Glavish and Matua (Chief) Gary Thompson, which translates into English as "the central thread of the cloak."

== History ==
The Cancer Control Agency was established by the New Zealand Government on 3 December 2019. The State Services Commission appointed Professor Diana Sarfati as the Agency's interim chief executive. Prime Minister Jacinda Ardern and Health Minister David Clark announced that the new agency was seeking to recruit 40 staff and would be supported by an Advisory Council. The inaugural Advisory Council consisted of Director General of Health Dr Ashley Bloomfield, Hei Āhuru Mōwai (National Māori Cancer Leadership Group) chair Dr Nina Scott, Auckland Hospital deputy chief Dr Richard Sullivan, Cancer Society of New Zealand's medical director Dr Chris Jackson, Waikato Bay of Plenty Cancer Society CEO Shelly Campbell, Health Consumer Councils of New Zealand chair Graeme Norton, general practitioner and Eastern Institute of Technology Professor of Māori and Indigenous Research David Tipene-Leach and Auckland District Health Board chief executive Ailsa Claire. The new agency was tasked with implementing the objectives of the Government's Cancer Action Plan 2019–29 and raising New Zealand's cancer outcomes to similar levels as other Organisation for Economic Co-operation and Development (OECD) countries.

In late April 2022, the Cancer Control Agency released a report which found that 1,000 cancer patients in New Zealand lacked access to 18 gold-standard cancer treatment drugs that were available in Australia. These drugs covered nine different tumour cancers affecting the lungs, breasts, bowels, liver, kidneys, bladders, ovaries, melanoma, heads and necks. The Cancer Society welcomed the Agency's report and urged the New Zealand Government to increase funding to the national drug purchasing agency Pharmac.

In July 2023, Rami Rahal was appointed as the Agency's chief executive. He stepped down in December 2025 for family reasons.

By November 2025, the Agency was working with the New Zealand Government to develop a national plan to eliminate cervical cancer.

On 11 December 2025, the Agency released its second State of Cancer report, a follow-up to its first report in 2020. It found that New Zealand's cancer survival rates lagged behind other developed countries, that Māori people and Pasifika New Zealanders had a higher risk of cancer than other groups, and that improved prevention efforts could reduce the number of cancer diagnoses each year by half. It also projected that cancer diagnoses rates would rise by 50% over the next two decades to 45,000.
