= Clare Healy =

New Zealand physician and expert in sexual assault medical care

Clare Healy ONZM
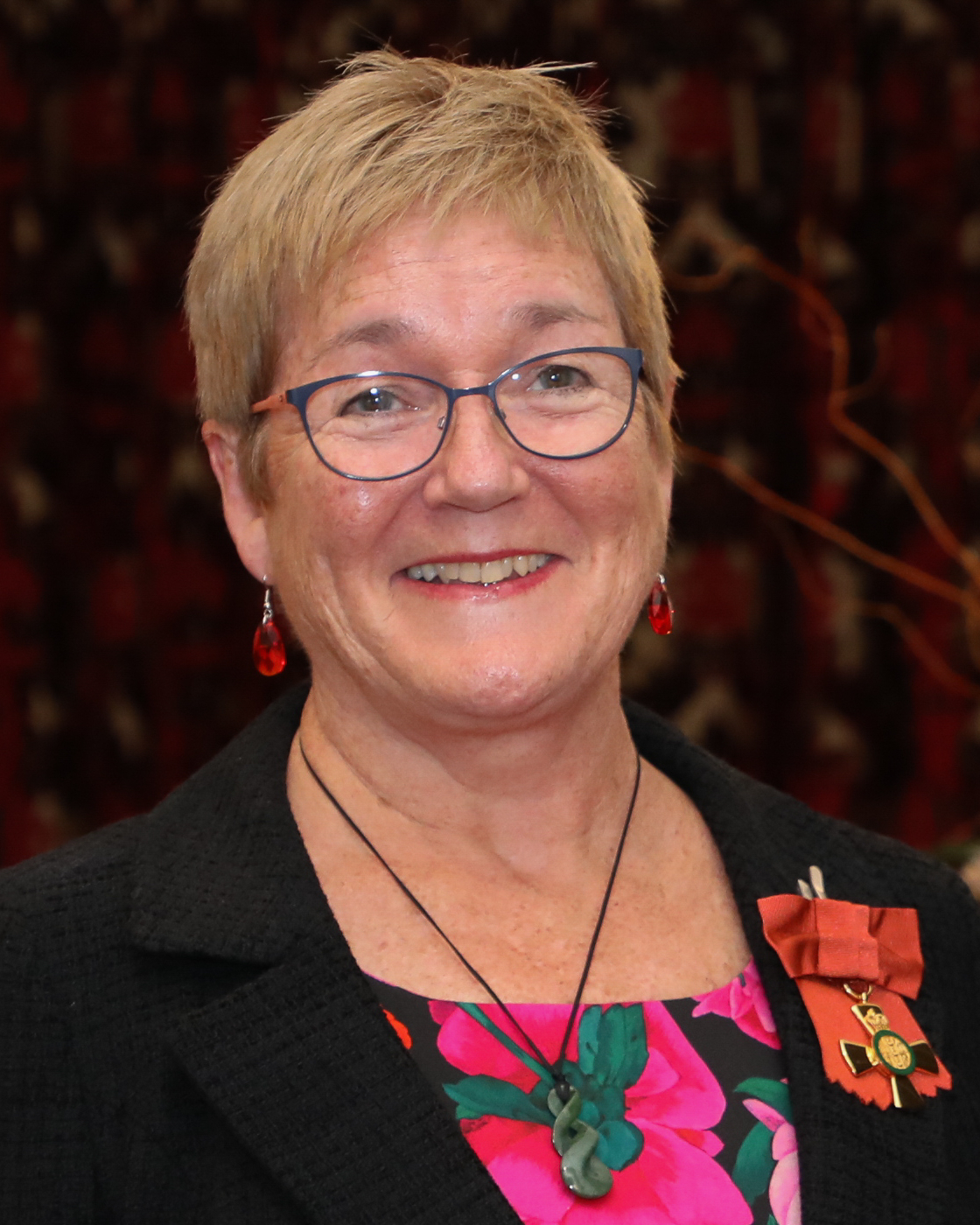
- Other name: Clare Francesca Jacobs
- Awards: Officer of the New Zealand Order of Merit

Clare Healy (also Clare Francesca Jacobs) ONZM is a New Zealand general practitioner, and has been described as New Zealand's foremost GP expert on medical care after sexual assault. In 2022 Healy was appointed an Officer of the New Zealand Order of Merit for services to medical forensic education.

== Career ==
Healy is a general practitioner in Christchurch, and director of the Cambridge Clinic, which provides services to victims of abuse. She is a specialist GP and also has a Master of Forensic Science degree from Monash University. Healy works for and with people affected by sexual assault, abuse, family violence and non-fatal strangulation.

Healy was a member of the Doctors for Sexual Abuse Care (now called Medical Sexual Assault Clinicians Aotearoa, MEDSAC) from 2000 to 2019, and was Chair from to 2001 to 2004. Healy has delivered medical forensic training programmes, lectured in the New Zealand Police course for sexual assault investigators, and been an independent expert in hundreds of courts cases. Healy contributed to the Ministry of Health’s Family Violence Assessment and Intervention Guidelines, and played a "key role" in the Family Violence (Amendments) Act 2018 which introduced strangulation or suffocation as new criminal offences. She also led the development of a non-fatal strangulation education programme through MEDSAC.

== Honours and awards ==
In the 2022 New Year's Honours Healy was appointed an Officer of the New Zealand Order of Merit for services to medical forensic education.

Healy was elected a Distinguished Fellow of the Royal New Zealand College of General Practitioners in 2021. The College described her as New Zealand's foremost GP expert on medical care after sexual assault.

== Selected works ==
- Min Karen Lo; Christine Foley; Clare Healy; Jeannie Oliphant; Susanna Kent (20 August 2014). "A response to: Macroscopically detected female genital injury after consensual and non-consensual vaginal penetration: A prospective comparison study [20 (2013) 884–901]". Journal of Clinical Forensic and Legal Medicine. 28: 47–49. doi:10.1016/J.JFLM.2014.08.011. ISSN 1752-928X. PMID 25440148. Wikidata Q51073894.
- Min Karen Lo; P Janet Say; Clare Healy (28 October 2010). "A response to: Chlamydia trachomatis infection in children: do not forget perinatal acquisition [17 (2010) 96-98]". Journal of Clinical Forensic and Legal Medicine. 17 (8): 450–451. doi:10.1016/J.JFLM.2010.09.011. ISSN 1752-928X. PMID 21056885. Wikidata Q43412832.
- Robyn Carey; Clare Healy; Dawn E. Elder (13 October 2009). "Foreign body sexual assault complicated by rectovaginal fistula". Journal of Clinical Forensic and Legal Medicine. 17 (3): 161–163. doi:10.1016/J.JFLM.2009.09.009. ISSN 1752-928X. PMID 20211458. Wikidata Q83154086.
