= Lynley Anderson =

New Zealand bioethicist

Academic background
- Theses: Knowledge and power in the clinical setting (1998); Stress fractures: ethics and the provision of sports medicine at the elite level in New Zealand (2005)

Lynley Carol Anderson is a New Zealand academic, and is a professor emeritus at the University of Otago, specialising in bioethics in health care education and sports and sports healthcare provision.

== Academic career ==
Anderson completed a Master of Health Science with a thesis titled Knowledge and power in the clinical setting at the University of Otago in 1998. She followed this with a PhD, also at Otago, titled Stress fractures: ethics and the provision of sports medicine at the elite level in New Zealand. Anderson then joined the faculty of the University of Otago, rising to associate professor in 2016 and full professor in 2022. Since 2017 Anderson has been the Head of the Bioethics Centre at the university. She has been chair of the Health Research Council Ethics Committee and the Ethics Committee for Assisted Reproductive Technology.

Anderson's research covers ethics in sports and sports health care. A 2019 paper by Anderson and colleagues Alison Heather and Taryn Knox examined the issue of trans women in elite sport, and argued that trans women had a physiological advantage over other women, and that the gender binary of sports should be changed to 'a more nuanced approach'. Anderson also researched the ethics of sending athletes to compete during a pandemic. Anderson is also interested in ethical issues faced by medical and healthcare students, and has written codes of ethics for the New Zealand Physiotherapy Board and the Sports Physiotherapy Special Interest Group. She was part of a team that developed an informed consent statement for the involvement of medical students in patient care, published in 2023.

Anderson retired in November 2025. She was awarded emeritus professor status at the university the following month.

== Selected works ==
- Taryn Knox; Anderson, Lynley Carol; Alison Heather (2019). "Transwomen in elite sport: scientific and ethical considerations". Journal of Medical Ethics. 45 (6): 395–403. doi:10.1136/medethics-2018-105208. PMID 31217230. Wikidata Q92883364.
- Osman Hassan Ahmed; Stephen John Sullivan; Schneiders, Anthony; Anderson, Lynley Carol; Chris Paton; McCrory, Paul (2013). "Ethical considerations in using Facebook for health care support: a case study using concussion management". Physical Medicine and Rehabilitation. 5 (4): 328–334. doi:10.1016/j.pmrj.2013.03.007. PMID 23622785. Wikidata Q51466489.
- Osborne, Hamish R.; Anderson, Lynley Carol; Peter Burt; Mark Young; David Gerrard (2015). "Australasian College of Sports Physicians-position statement: the place of mesenchymal stem/stromal cell therapies in sport and exercise medicine". British Journal of Sports Medicine. 50 (20): 1237–1244. doi:10.1136/bjsports-2015-095711. PMID 26701927. Wikidata Q38678597.
- Crampton, Peter Roy; Wilkinson, Timothy James; Anderson, Lynley Carol; Sue Walthert; Wilson, Hamish John (2015). "Bullying in health care settings: time for a whole-of-system response". The New Zealand Medical Journal. 128 (1424): 10–13. PMID 26922442. Wikidata Q53164624.
- McNamee, Michael; Bradley Partridge; Anderson, Lynley Carol (2015). "Concussion Ethics and Sports Medicine". Clinics in Sports Medicine. 35 (2): 257–267. doi:10.1016/j.csm.2015.10.008. PMID 26832975. Wikidata Q38718742.
- Jean Hay-Smith; Melanie Brown; Anderson, Lynley Carol; Treharne, Gareth J. (2016). "Once a clinician, always a clinician: a systematic review to develop a typology of clinician-researcher dual-role experiences in health research with patient-participants". BMC Medical Research Methodology. 16: 95. doi:10.1186/s12874-016-0203-6. PMC 4977678. PMID 27506386. Wikidata Q36099338.
- Anderson, Lynley Carol (2011). "Bloodgate: were the punishments fair?". British Journal of Sports Medicine. 45 (12): 948–949. doi:10.1136/bjsm.2011.083881. PMID 21511739. Wikidata Q48686022.
- Bagg, Warwick; John Adams; Anderson, Lynley Carol; Phillipa Malpas; Grant Pidgeon; Michael Thorn; David Tulloch; Cathy Zhong; Alan F Merry (2015). "Medical Students and informed consent: A consensus statement prepared by the Faculties of Medical and Health Science of the Universities of Auckland and Otago, Chief Medical Officers of District Health Boards, New Zealand Medical Students' Association and the Medical Council of New Zealand". The New Zealand Medical Journal. 128 (1414): 27–35. PMID 26117388. Wikidata Q48023457.
