= Samy Azer =

Australian physician & professor

Professor Samy Azer
- Education: The University of Sydney; UNSW Sydney
- Medical career
- Profession: Professor, Physician, Author, medical educator
- Sub-specialties: Problem-based learning

Samy A. Azer is an Egyptian-born Australian physician, author and medical educator who has contributed to medical education internationally.

== Academic career ==
Professor Azer has contributed to medical education at the University of Sydney (1997–1998) and the University of Melbourne (1999–2006). He is Professor of Medical Education and the Chair of Curriculum and Research Unit at King Saud University College of Medicine in Riyadh, Saudi Arabia. He was Professor of Medical Education and the Chair of Medical Education Research and Development Unit, Faculty of Medicine, Universiti Teknologi MARA Malaysia, from 2007 to 2009. Prior to this, he had a distinguished career in clinical medicine, research, and medical education.

Prior to joining Universiti Teknologi MARA, he was a Visiting Professor of Medical Education at the University of Toyama, and Senior Lecturer in Medical Education at the Faculty of Medicine, Dentistry and Health Sciences, the University of Melbourne, from 1999 to 2006, and Senior Lecturer in Medical Education at the University of Sydney from 1997 to 1998, Post-doctoral Fellow, Faculty of Medicine, Kansas Medical Centre, Kansas, USA, 1995.

His clinical work and research was in the area of gastroenterology and hepatology and he was awarded a PhD in Medicine from the University of Sydney in 1995, Master of Education from the University of New South Wales in 1993, Fellowship of the American College of Gastroenterology in 1998, and Master of Public Health, from the University of New South Wales in 2005.

During his career he was appointed as an editor at PLOS ONE, the MEDICINE Journal, and the World Journal of Gastroenterology. He was also on the editorial board of the International Journal of Medical Education, BMC Medical Education, and the Editorial Board of MedEDWorld, as well as other journals and joint membership of the policy committee of the ASME, the UK. He is the convener of PBL-SIG, for the Australia and New Zealand Association for Medical Education (ANZAME).

He has published widely in the area of Problem-Based Learning (PBL), Medical Education, and Assessment and has written a number of books on PBL. Over the last 10 years he trained over 1500 academics in the area of Problem-Based Learning. His trainees were from a wide range of disciplines including medicine, nursing, physiotherapy, dentistry, occupational therapy, speech pathology, nutrition, education, management and administration, business, engineering, leadership and law. His trainees were from universities in Australia, Japan, Malaysia, Taiwan, Sweden and other countries.

During 2003 to 2006, he has also introduced PBL to 6 schools in the eastern region of Victoria, Australia,

== Qualifications ==
- M.B., B.Ch. Faculty of Medicine (1971–1977)
- MSc (Med.)
- PhD (Med.), Faculty of Medicine, University of Sydney, Australia (1990–1995; graduated in 1995)
- MEd, University of New South Wales, Australia (1991–1993; graduated in 1993)
- Fellowship of the American College of Gastroenterology, American College of Gastroenterology, USA (elected in 1998)
- M.P.H., University of New South Wales, Australia (1998–2005; graduated in 2005)

== Selected works ==
- Azer, Samy A. (2006). Core Clinical Cases in Basic Biomedical Science: A Problem-Based Learning ... Hodder-Arnold. ISBN 9780340816714.
- Azer, Samy A. (2008). Navigating Problem-Based Learning. Sydney: Churchill Livingstone, Elsevier. ISBN 9780729538275.
- Azer, Samy A. (2005). "The Liver. An Interactive CD-ROM Melbourne, University of Melbourne"..
- Azer, Samy A. (1994). Use and Interpretation of Serum Bile Acids in Hepatic Injury and Disease. PhD Thesis, University of Sydney, 1994.
- Azer, Samy A. (2003, 2005, 2007, 2009) Emedicine. Intestinal perforartion.
- Azer, Samy A. (2013) Making Sense of Clinical Teaching. Hodder-Arnold, UK.
- Azer, Samy A. (2022). Clinical Cases in Internal Medicine ... Elsevier. ISBN 9780702080494.
