= Chrystal Jaye =

New Zealand medical anthropologist

Academic background
- Education: University of Otago

Chrystal Jaye is a New Zealand medical anthropologist, and is a full professor at the University of Otago, specialising in social science in health care. She has researched social discourse around euthanasia, prevention of age-related workplace injuries, and rural health and wellbeing.

== Academic career ==
Jaye is a medical anthropologist. Jaye completed a Bachelor of Arts, a PhD and a Postgraduate Diploma of Tertiary Teaching at the University of Otago. Jaye then joined the faculty of the University of Otago, rising to associate professor in 2012, and full professor in 2023. Since 2020, Jaye has been the Associate Dean (Postgraduate) for the Division of Health Sciences at the university. She has previously been head of the university's General Practice and Rural Health Department.

Jaye has varied research interests. She has published on the need for greater interventions in the workplace to prevent injuries for older workers. That study found that during their study period, more than a fifth of traumatic work injuries ACC claims were for workers aged 55–79 years. The researchers pointed out that as the number of people working past retirement age is predicted to double by 2036, more would be need to be done to reduce hazards.

Jaye also conducted an analysis of social media discourse related to the End of Life Choice Act 2019 on euthanasia, and investigated spirituality in a hospice setting. Another research interest is rural health and well-being, especially how the Mycoplasma bovis outbreak affected farmers.

== Selected works ==
- Tony Egan; Jaye, Chrystal (2009). "Communities of clinical practice: the social organization of clinical learning". Health. 13 (1): 107–125. doi:10.1177/1363459308097363. PMID 19103718. Wikidata Q37356706.
- Richard Egan; Rod MacLeod; Chrystal Jaye; McGee, Rob; Baxter, Joanne Mary; Herbison, Peter Graham (2011). "What is spirituality? Evidence from a New Zealand hospice study". Mortality. 16 (4): 307–324. doi:10.1080/13576275.2011.613267. Wikidata Q60684071.
- Jaye, Chrystal (2002). "Doing qualitative research in general practice: methodological utility and engagement". Family Practice. 19 (5): 557–562. doi:10.1093/fampra/19.5.557. PMID 12356712. Wikidata Q30332008.
- Jaye, Chrystal; Tony Egan; Sarah Parker (2006). "'Do as I say, not as I do': Medical Education and Foucault's Normalizing Technologies of Self". Anthropology and Medicine. 13 (2): 141–155. doi:10.1080/13648470600738450. PMID 27267978. Wikidata Q47193699.
- Jaye, Chrystal; Jason Hope; Isobel R Martin (2002). "What do general practice patients know about their prescription medications?". The New Zealand Medical Journal. 115 (1162): U183. PMID 12386662. Wikidata Q39633630.
- Jaye, Chrystal; Tony Egan; Kelby Smith-Han (2010). "Communities of clinical practice and normalising technologies of self: learning to fit in on the surgical ward". Anthropology and Medicine. 17 (1): 59–73. doi:10.1080/13648470903569388. PMID 20419517. Wikidata Q51773651.
- Jaye, Chrystal; Tilyard, Murray William (2002). "A qualitative comparative investigation of variation in general practitioners' prescribing patterns". British Journal of General Practice. 52 (478): 381–386. PMC 1314293. PMID 12014535. Wikidata Q34221719.
