= Scott Macfarlane =

Scott Macfarlane may refer to:

- Scott Macfarlane (journalist), American investigative reporter and congressional correspondent
- Scott Macfarlane (oncologist), New Zealand paediatric oncologist
- Walter Scott MacFarlane (1896–1979), Canadian bard and soldier
