= Webster Centre for Infectious Diseases =

Research centre at University of Otago, New Zealand

Coordinates: 45.86453°S 170.51308°E

The Webster Centre for Infectious Diseases is a research centre based at the University of Otago School of Biomedical Sciences, University of Otago, Dunedin, New Zealand dedicated to supporting basic research in infectious diseases throughout New Zealand. Primarily its mission is to provide molecular solutions to problems in infectious diseases through the application of modern methods of molecular and translational research. The Webster Centre endeavors to be a major player in the development of new vaccines, diagnostics and antimicrobials.

The Webster Centre has adopted a multi-disciplinary approach and researchers in the areas of chemistry, biochemistry, microbiology, immunology, molecular genetics, pharmacy, pharmacology and public health are all part of the centre. The Webster Centre offers research support in the forms of student support, sponsored seminar programs and New Zealand wide symposiums on Infectious Disease Research.

The Webster Centre for Infectious Diseases was formerly directed by Kurt Krause, Professor of Biochemistry.
