= University of Otago School of Biomedical Sciences =

School in New Zealand

Coordinates: 45.86864°S 170.50812°E

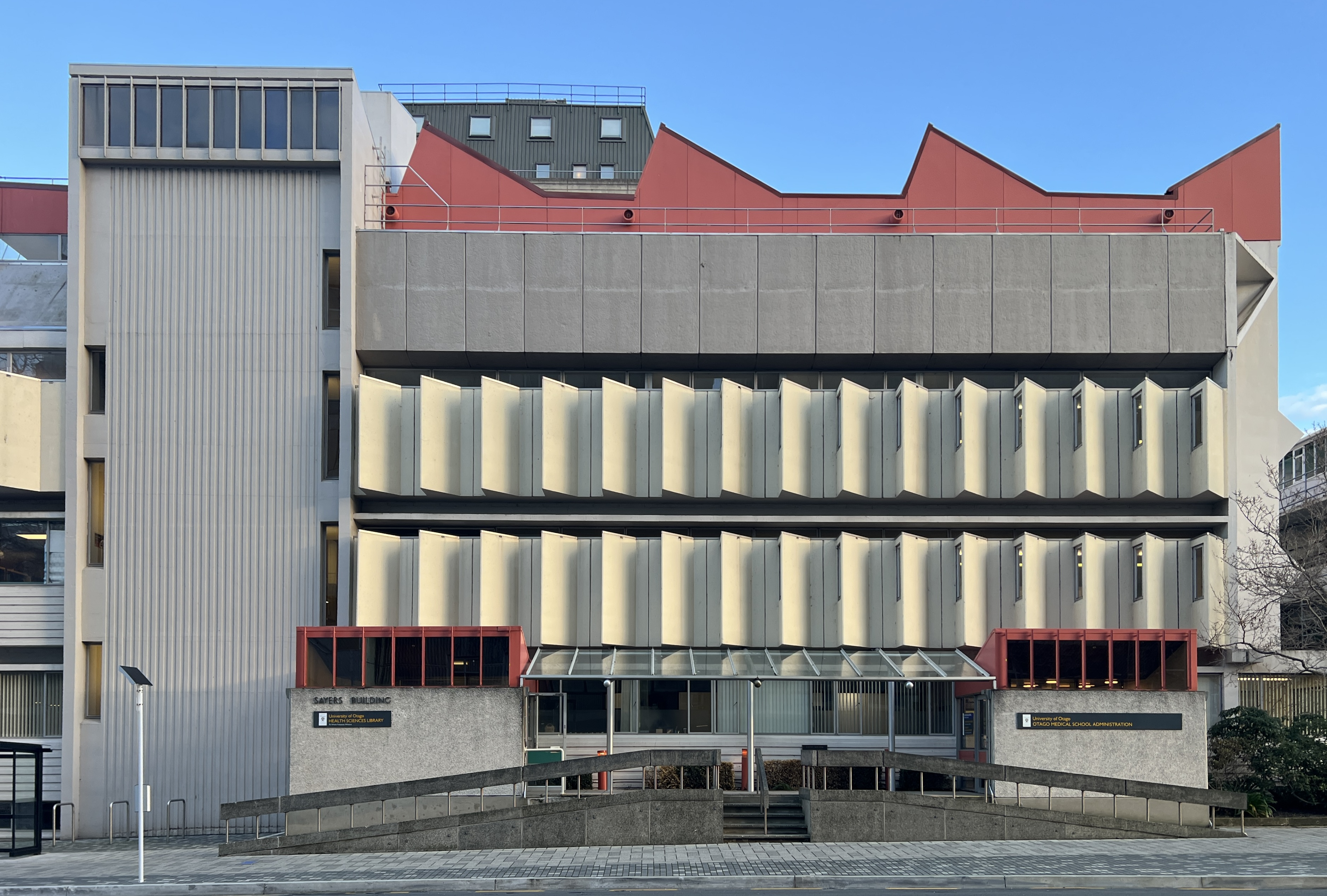
University of Otago School of Biomedical Sciences

The University of Otago Faculty of Biomedical Sciences (formerly Otago School of Medical Sciences, then School of Biomedical Sciences) is one of seven component schools in the University of Otago Division of Health Sciences (which also comprises Otago Medical School; Faculty of Dentistry; School of Pharmacy; School of Physiotherapy; University of Otago, Christchurch; and University of Otago, Wellington).

The Faculty of Biomedical Sciences is based in Dunedin, New Zealand, and comprises five departments:

- Department of Anatomy
- Department of Biochemistry
- Department of Microbiology and Immunology (including the Webster Centre for Infectious Diseases)
- Department of Pharmacology and Toxicology
- Department of Physiology

In addition to conducting teaching and research in the above fields, the Faculty of Biomedical Sciences contributes to the teaching of the second- and third-year medical students at the University of Otago Medical School.
