= Brian Robinson (chemist) =

New Zealand inorganic chemist (1940–2016)

- Born: Brian Harford Robinson; 24 April 1940; Christchurch, New Zealand
- Died: 30 August 2016 (aged 76); Wellington, New Zealand
- Education: University of Canterbury
- Spouse: Judith Rae (m. 1962)
- Children: 4
- Relatives: Diana Sarfati (daughter-in-law)
- Scientific career
- Fields: Inorganic and organometallic chemistry
- Workplaces: University of Otago
- Thesis: Studies in the coordination chemistry of certain transition metals (1964)

Brian Harford Robinson (24 April 1940 – 30 August 2016) was a New Zealand inorganic chemist. He is noted for his contribution to cluster chemistry and the design of organometallic compounds with biomedical applications.

== Early life and education ==
Born in Christchurch on 24 April 1940, Robinson was the son of Jack Robinson and Lurline Robinson (née Cross). He was educated at Christchurch Boys' High School, and then studied at the University of Canterbury, graduating Master of Science with second-class honours in chemistry in 1962. He completed a PhD at the same institution in 1964. His thesis, titled Studies in the coordination chemistry of certain transition metals, elucidated the first structure of a cluster compound and its unusual delocalised bonding.

On 12 May 1962, Robinson married Judith Rae, and they went on to have four children.

== Academic and research career ==
After periods of post-doctoral research at the University of Newcastle upon Tyne and the University of Manchester in 1965 and 1966, Robinson was a faculty member in the Department of Chemistry at the University of Otago in Dunedin from 1967 to 2006. He became a professor in 1985 and the Mellor Professor of Chemistry in 1996, and served as the head of the Department of Chemistry from 1986 to 1998. When he retired in 2006 he was made a professor emeritus.

Building on his doctoral research, Robinson proposed that metal carbonyl clusters could participate in electron transfer reactions, and demonstrated that clusters are able to be reversibly reduced. Other research areas that he pursued included the design of organometallic compounds for use in biomedical research, and the development of molecular switches.

== Later life and death ==
Following his retirement, Robinson continued to be an active researcher, including work to develop a post-surgical protective gel based on chitosan from squid. The resulting product was sold to American medical technology company Medtronic in 2012. In 2013, Robinson became chair of the board of the Dunedin branch of the University of the Third Age.

Robinson died in Wellington on 30 August 2016.

== Honours and awards ==
In 1999 Robinson was elected a Fellow of the Royal Society of New Zealand. In 2010 he was awarded a Marsden Medal by the New Zealand Association of Scientists, in recognition of his lifetime contribution to science. He was also a Fellow of the New Zealand Institute of Chemistry, and the Society of Perfumers and Flavourists.

An active Rotarian, Robinson was a recipient of the Paul Harris Fellowship for community service in 2004.
