= Diana Sarfati =

New Zealand cancer researcher

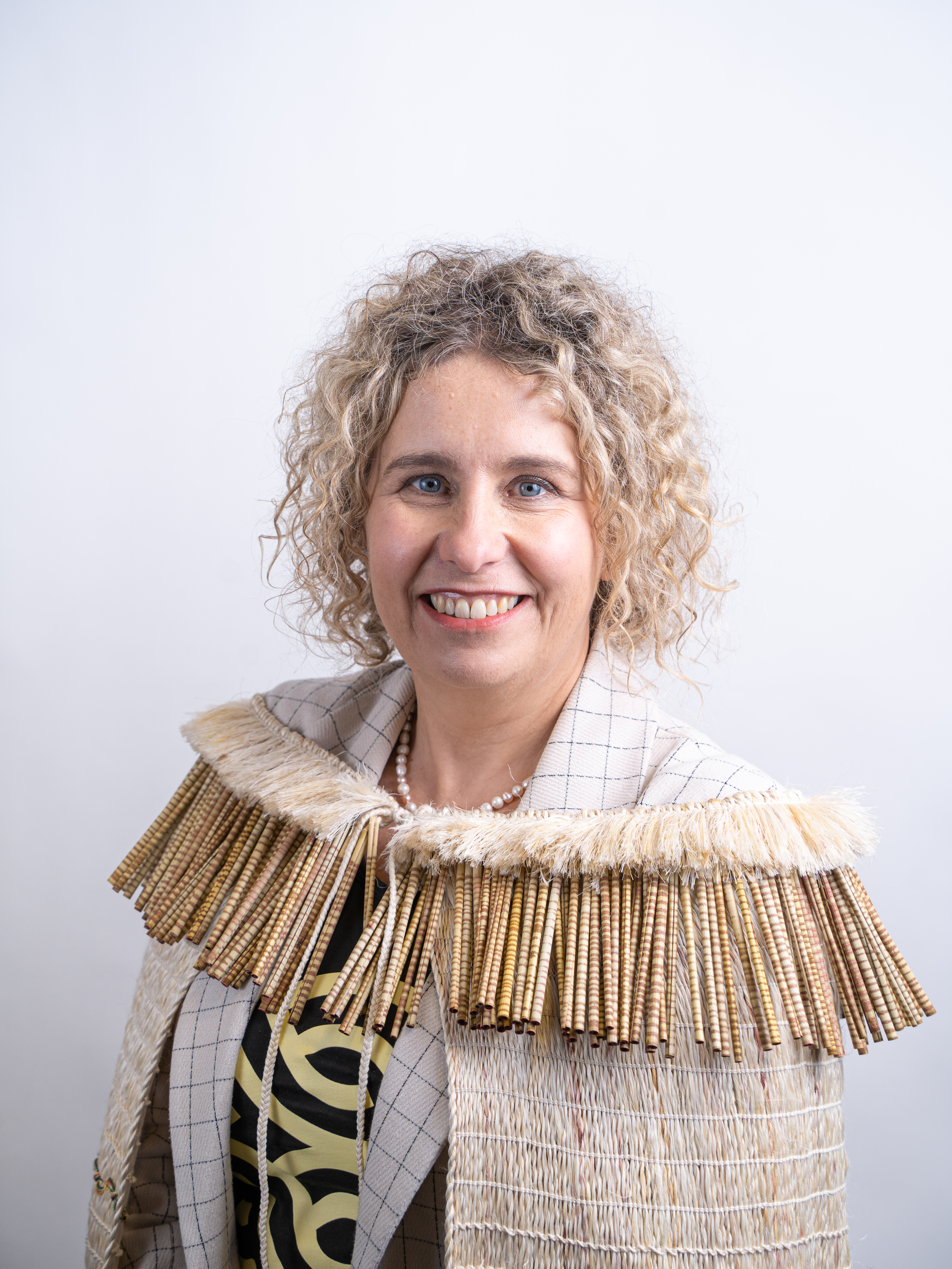
- Sarfati in 2019

Director-General of Health
- In office 1 December 2022 – 21 February 2025
- Preceded by: Ashley Bloomfield
- Succeeded by: Audrey Sonerson

Personal details
- Born: 1967 or 1968 (age 58–59)
- Education: University of Otago
- Scientific career
- Children: 3
- Relatives: Brian Robinson (father-in-law)
- Fields: Epidemiology
- Workplaces: University of Otago
- Thesis: Developing new comorbidity indices for cancer populations using administrative data (2014)

Diana Sarfati (born 1967/1968) is a New Zealand cancer researcher and senior public servant. She was formerly head of the Cancer Control Agency from 2019 to 2022 and Director-General of Health from 2022 to 2025.

== Education and family ==
Sarfati attended medical school at the University of Otago, graduating with a Bachelor of Medicine, Bachelor of Surgery in 1991. Later, she returned to Otago for postgraduate education, earning a Master of Public Health (with Distinction) in 1998. Her PhD, completed in 2014 at the same university, found that administrative data were adequate for measuring comorbidity in cancer populations and was determined to be an exceptional thesis.

Safarti's father, John Sarfati, was also a medical doctor. She has three children.

== Career ==
=== Medicine and academia ===
Early in her career, Sarfati worked on a cancer ward in Palmerston North. Later she became an academic and public health researcher at the University of Otago. She was appointed a senior research fellow and senior lecturer in 2004. From 2006 to 2009, she was regional training director at the Australasian College of Public Health Medicine. She was appointed an associate professor at Otago's Department of Public Health in 2013. In that role, she was also director of the cancer and chronic conditions research group. Her research focused on disparities in cancer outcomes.

In 2015, she was appointed co-head of the Department of Public Health at the University of Otago, alongside Richard Edwards, and was also appointed a professor. From 2018 she became the department's sole head. Sarfati was also a member of the International Advisory Committee to Lancet Oncology, IARC's international expert group on social inequalities in cancer, the Board of the International Cancer Benchmarking Project, and she led a Lancet Oncology series on cancer in small island developing states. She is a former member of the National Cancer Programme Leadership Board, the National Screening Advisory Group, the National Ethics Advisory Committee, the Bowel Cancer Taskforce and the National Bowel Cancer Screening Advisory Committee.

=== Public administration ===
In 2019, Sarfati was seconded to the Ministry of Health as National Director of Cancer Control. The Government established a new Cancer Control Agency and she was named the agency's interim chief executive on 1 December 2019. She was permanently appointed to that role on 1 July 2020. During her period leading the agency, it reported on the state of cancer in New Zealand, the impact of COVID-19 on cancer services, cancer prevention, and the gap in cancer medicine availability between Australia and New Zealand. She also sat on Health New Zealand's Planned Care Taskforce.

Sarfati was appointed acting Director-General of Health in July 2022, succeeding Ashley Bloomfield, who had led the Ministry of Health through the COVID-19 pandemic. She was named the permanent appointment to that role in November 2022. She announced her resignation from the position in February 2025.

== Recognition ==
In 2019, Sarfati was named NEXT's Woman of the Year for her focus on promoting equitable cancer treatment.

== Selected works ==
- Gurney, Jason K.; Millar, Elinor; Dunn, Alex; Pirie, Ruth; Mako, Michelle; Manderson, John; Hardie, Claire; Jackson, Chris G.C.A.; North, Richard; Ruka, Myra; Scott, Nina; Sarfati, Diana (May 2021). "The impact of the COVID-19 pandemic on cancer diagnosis and service access in New Zealand–a country pursuing COVID-19 elimination". The Lancet Regional Health - Western Pacific. 10 100127. doi:10.1016/j.lanwpc.2021.100127. PMC 7983868. PMID 33778794.
- Sarfati, Diana; Dyer, Rachel; Sam, Filipina Amosa-Lei; Barton, Michael; Bray, Freddie; Buadromo, Eka; Ekeroma, Alec; Foliaki, Sunia; Fong, James; Herman, Josephine; Huggins, Linda; Maoate, Kiki; Meredith, Ineke; Mola, Glen; Palafox, Neal; Puloka, Viliami; Shin, Hai-Rim; Skeen, Jane; Snowdon, Wendy; Tafuna'i, Malama; Teng, Andrea; Watters, David; Vivili, Paula (September 2019). "Cancer control in the Pacific: big challenges facing small island states". The Lancet Oncology. 20 (9): e475–e492. doi:10.1016/S1470-2045(19)30400-0. PMC 7746436. PMID 31395476.
- Sarfati, Diana; Koczwara, Bogda; Jackson, Christopher (July 2016). "The impact of comorbidity on cancer and its treatment". CA. 66 (4): 337–350. doi:10.3322/caac.21342. PMID 26891458. S2CID 5264129.
- Gurney, J. K.; Stanley, J.; Baker, M. G.; Wilson, N. J.; Sarfati, D. (October 2016). "Estimating the risk of acute rheumatic fever in New Zealand by age, ethnicity and deprivation". Epidemiology and Infection. 144 (14): 3058–3067. doi:10.1017/S0950268816001291. PMC 9150400. PMID 27311633. S2CID 11969656.
- Pilleron, Sophie; Sarfati, Diana; Janssen-Heijnen, Maryska; Vignat, Jérôme; Ferlay, Jacques; Bray, Freddie; Soerjomataram, Isabelle (January 2019). "Global cancer incidence in older adults, 2012 and 2035: A population-based study" (PDF). International Journal of Cancer. 144 (1): 49–58. doi:10.1002/ijc.31664. PMID 29978474. S2CID 49709378.
- Sarfati, D.; Blakely, T.; Pearce, N. (April 2010). "Measuring cancer survival in populations: relative survival vs cancer-specific survival". International Journal of Epidemiology. 39 (2): 598–610. doi:10.1093/ije/dyp392. PMID 20142331.
- Hill, Sarah; Sarfati, Diana; Robson, Bridget; Blakely, Tony (January 2013). "Indigenous inequalities in cancer: what role for health care?". ANZ Journal of Surgery. 83 (1–2): 36–41. doi:10.1111/ans.12041. hdl:20.500.11820/e407b5d5-8016-402e-9e36-058b3b279658. PMID 23253098.
- McDonald, Andrea M.; Sarfati, Diana; Baker, Michael G.; Blakely, Tony (April 2015). "Trends in Helicobacter pylori Infection Among Māori, Pacific, and European Birth Cohorts in New Zealand". Helicobacter. 20 (2): 139–145. doi:10.1111/hel.12186. PMID 25403622.
- Hill, S.; Sarfati, D.; Blakely, T.; Robson, B.; Purdie, G.; Chen, J.; Dennett, E.; Cormack, D.; Cunningham, R.; Dew, K.; McCreanor, T.; Kawachi, I. (February 2010). "Survival disparities in Indigenous and non-Indigenous New Zealanders with colon cancer: the role of patient comorbidity, treatment and health service factors" (PDF). Journal of Epidemiology & Community Health. 64 (2): 117–123. doi:10.1136/jech.2008.083816. PMID 20056966.
- Sarfati, Diana; Hill, Sarah; Blakely, Tony; Robson, Bridget; Purdie, Gordon; Dennett, Elizabeth; Cormack, Donna; Dew, Kevin (December 2009). "The effect of comorbidity on the use of adjuvant chemotherapy and survival from colon cancer: a retrospective cohort study". BMC Cancer. 9 (1). doi:10.1186/1471-2407-9-116. hdl:11343/256064. PMC 2678274. PMID 19379520.
- Scott, Kate M; Sarfati, Diana; Tobias, Martin I; Haslett, Stephen J (December 2000). "A challenge to the cross-cultural validity of the SF-36 health survey: factor structure in Māori, Pacific and New Zealand European ethnic groups". Social Science & Medicine. 51 (11): 1655–1664. doi:10.1016/S0277-9536(00)00083-6.
