= Ashley Bloomfield =

New Zealand director-general of public health

Sir Ashley Bloomfield KNZM
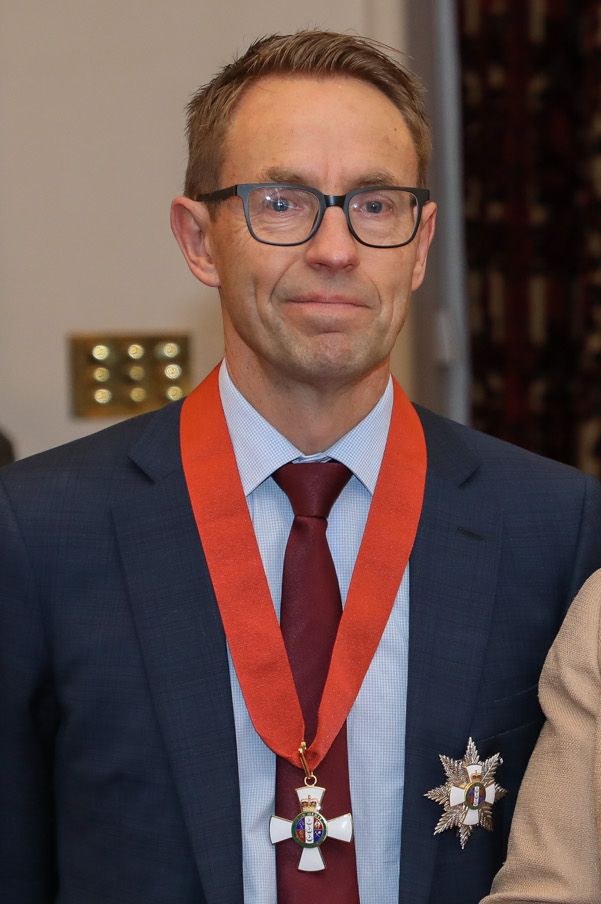
- Bloomfield in 2023

Director-General of Health
- In office 11 June 2018 – 29 July 2022
- Preceded by: Chai Chuah
- Succeeded by: Diana Sarfati

Personal details
- Born: Ashley Robin Bloomfield; March 1966 (age 60) Napier, New Zealand
- Spouse: Libby (m. 1990)
- Children: 3
- Education: University of Auckland
- Occupation: Public health official; Academic

Sir Ashley Robin Bloomfield KNZM (born March 1966) is a New Zealand public health official. He served as the chief executive of the Ministry of Health and the country's director-general of health from 2018 to 2022. He was the public-facing health specialist liaising with the media during the COVID-19 pandemic in New Zealand on behalf of the government, from the first press conference on 27 January 2020.

== Early life and family ==
Bloomfield was born in Napier in March 1966, one of three children of Allan Olaf Bloomfield and Myreine Alice Bloomfield (née Osborne). His mother was a schoolteacher, while his father was a lieutenant colonel in the Royal New Zealand Infantry Regiment (Territorial Force) and a manager at Mitsubishi Motors in Porirua, and was appointed a Member of the Order of the British Empire in the 1974 New Year Honours.

Bloomfield grew up in Tawa, a suburb of Wellington, and was educated at Scots College, where he was head prefect, dux, played 1st XV rugby and was a member of the cast of the college's production of Oklahoma!.

Bloomfield graduated Bachelor of Medicine, Bachelor of Surgery from the University of Auckland in 1990. About the same time, he married his wife, Libby, also a doctor, and the couple went on to have three children.

== Career ==
Bloomfield completed several years of clinical work and from 1996 specialised in public health medicine, concentrating on non-communicable diseases. In 1997, he graduated from the University of Auckland with a Master of Public Health degree, with first-class honours.

Between 2004 and 2006, Bloomfield was the Ministry of Health's acting director of public health. From 2006 to 2010, he was the ministry's chief public health adviser.

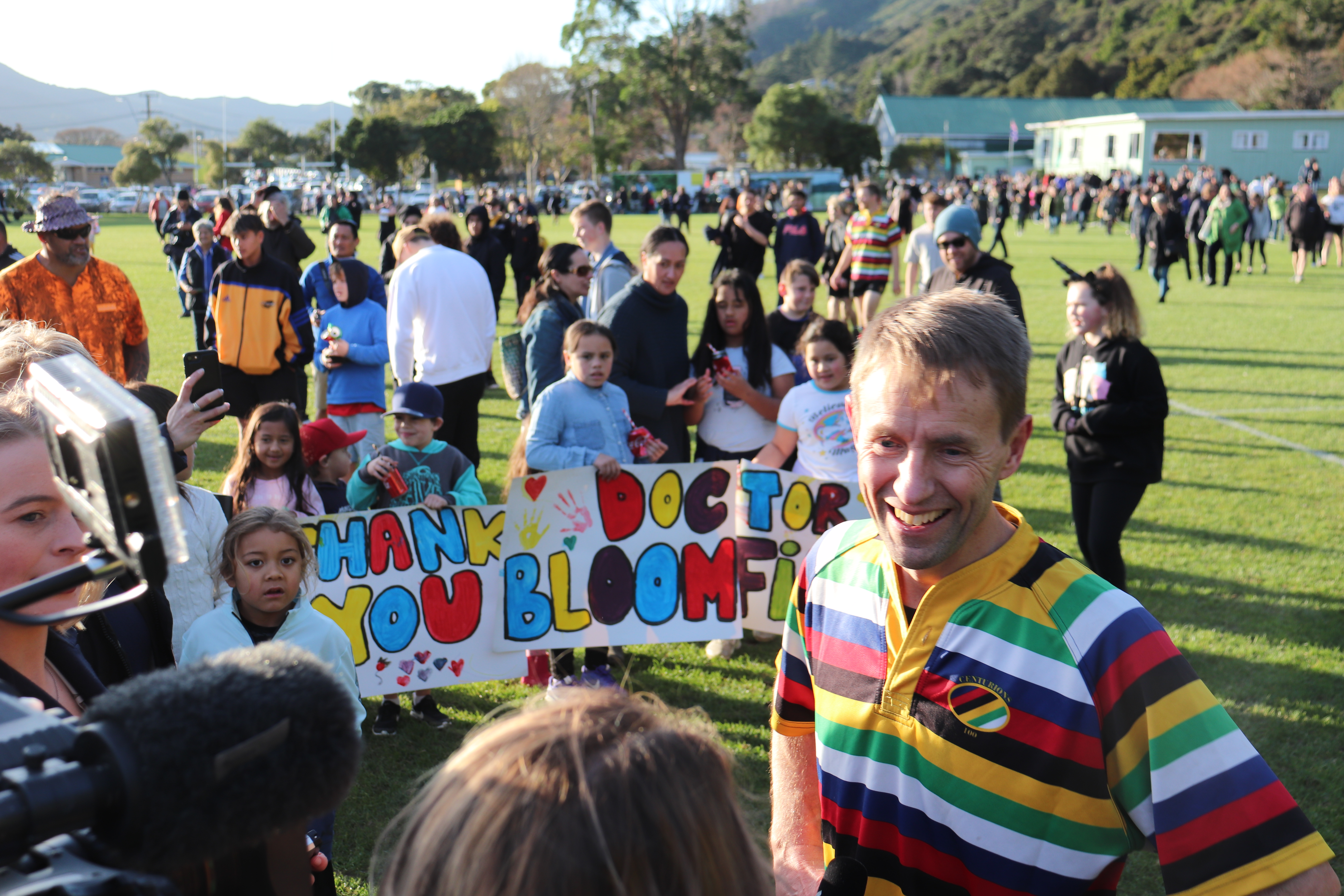
Bloomfield after the 2020 Parliamentary rugby match

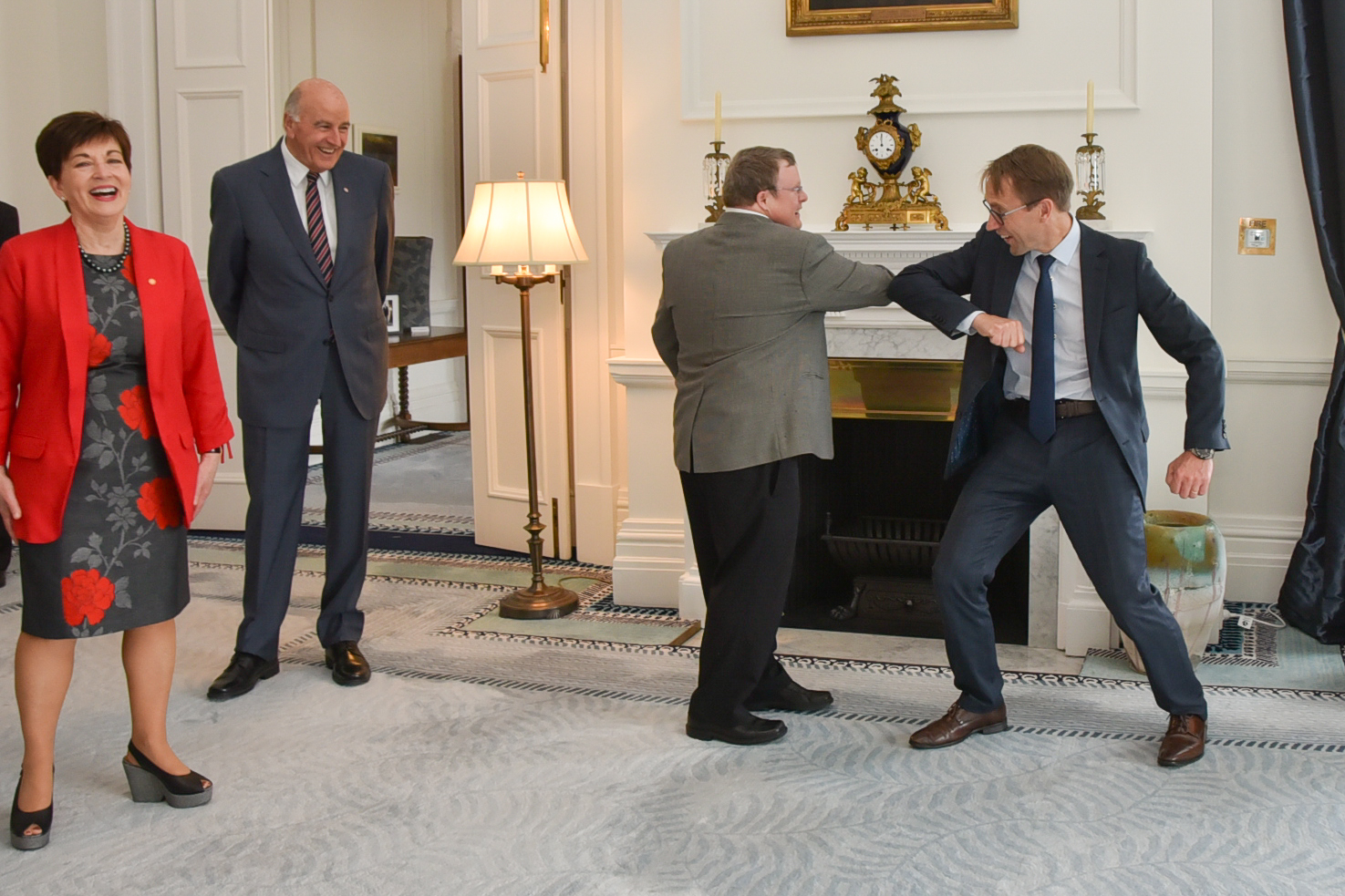
Bloomfield (right) elbow bumps with Michael Holdsworth at Government House, Wellington, in October 2020, while Dame Patsy Reddy and Sir David Gascoigne look on

From late 2010 to late 2011, based at the World Health Organization in Geneva, Bloomfield worked on non-communicable disease prevention and control with a global focus. From 2012 to 2015, he held leading positions across district health boards with Capital & Coast District, Hutt Valley, and Wairarapa. From 2015 to 2018, Bloomfield was chief executive at Hutt Valley District Health Board. In the first half of 2018, Bloomfield was seconded to the Capital & Coast District Health Board where he was interim chief executive. On 11 June 2018, he became the chief executive of the country's Ministry of Health and the country's Director-General of Health. After he started as the ministry's Chief Executive he attended a leadership programme at Saïd Business School at the University of Oxford.

Colleagues describe Bloomfield as "measured, methodical, calm and sensible". Former health reporter Tess Nichol, writing for the American online magazine Slate, described him as "New Zealand's current obsession, an unlikely heartthrob, a mild-mannered health care hero". Former prime minister, Geoffrey Palmer, remarked about Bloomfield: "It is a long time since a public servant has become so well-known." Perhaps in part due to the relative effectiveness of the COVID-19 measures taken by the New Zealand Government, Bloomfield has developed a cult following. Facebook pages and merchandise have been created celebrating Bloomfield, and at least one person has had his image tattooed on their body. When Bloomfield played for an invitational Centurions side in their 2020 rugby match against the Parliamentary team, children took placards to the game to support him. Bloomfield chose the nickname "The Eliminator" for the match, in which he opened the scoring with the first try.

In November 2020, Bloomfield was named one of the best-dressed men on David Hartnell's best-dressed list.

In August 2021, Bloomfield apologised to the New Zealand Parliament's health select committee for providing them with incorrect information about a United Nations worker from Fiji who later tested positive for COVID-19.

In early April 2022, Public Service Commissioner Peter Hughes announced that Bloomfield would step down as Director-General of Health on 29 July 2022.

In late July 2022, Bloomfield ordered 14 territorial authorities including the Auckland Council, Hastings District Council, New Plymouth District Council, Rotorua Lakes District Council, Tauranga City Council, Waitaki District Council, Far North District Council, and the Whangarei District Council to add fluoride to their water supplies. These local authorities have between six months and three years depending on the circumstances to ensure that their water supplies are fluoridated by using hydrofluorosilicic acid as an additive to water supplies. He stated that this measure would boost the number of the New Zealand population receiving water fluoridation from 51% to 60%.

Bloomfield is to become the first professor of a new Public Policy Impact Institute at the University of Auckland's Faculty of Medicine and Health Sciences.

== Honours and awards ==
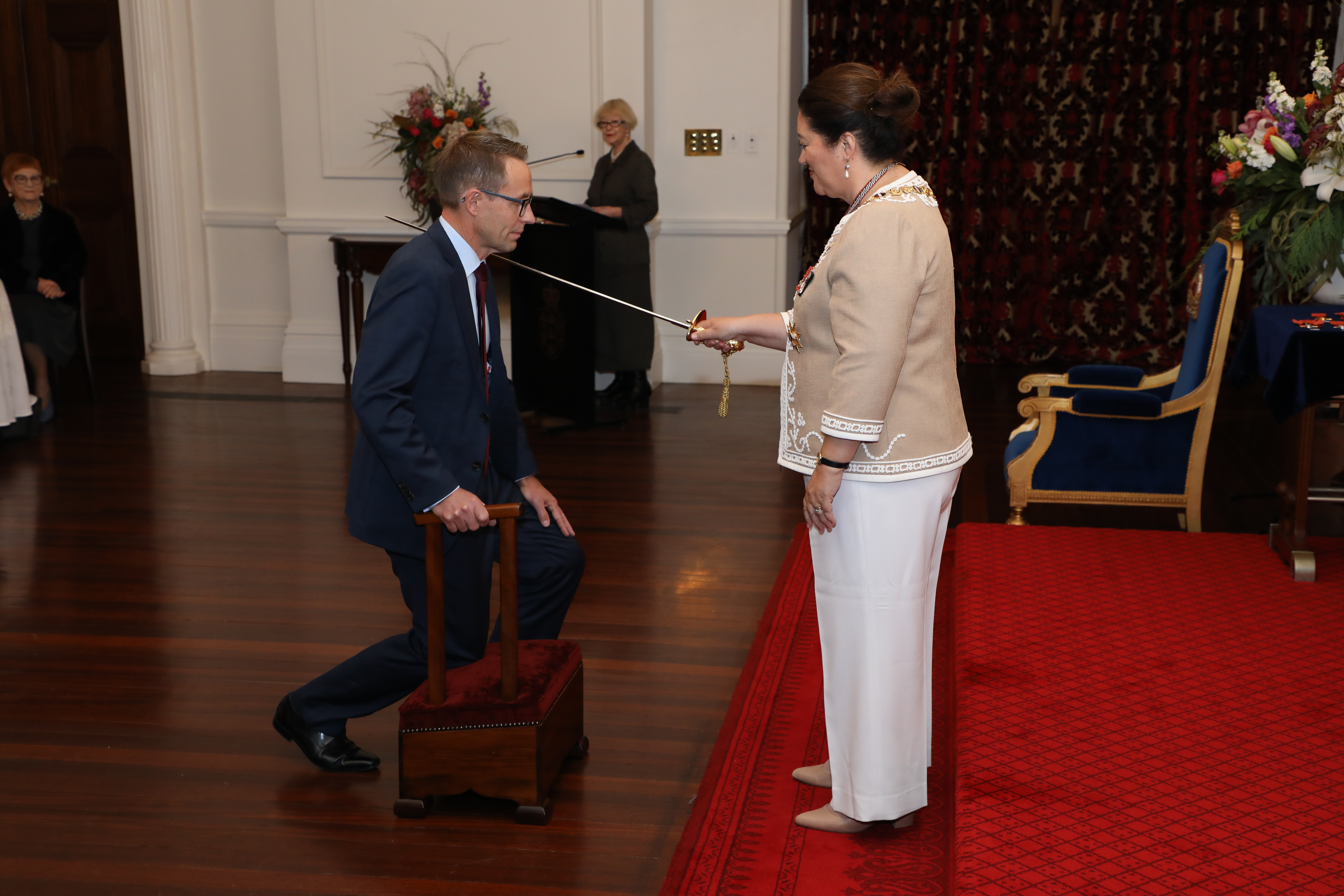
Bloomfield's investiture as a Knight Companion of the New Zealand Order of Merit by the governor-general, Dame Cindy Kiro, at Government House, Wellington, on 31 May 2023

In the 2023 New Year Honours, Bloomfield was appointed a Knight Companion of the New Zealand Order of Merit, for services to public health.
