= Alison Heather =

New Zealand physiology academic

Alison Kay Heather
- Education: University of Sydney
- Children: 2
- Scientific career
- Fields: Physiology
- Workplaces: Heart Research Institute, University of Technology Sydney, University of Otago.
- Thesis: Between feast and famine : adaptation of Escherichia coli to growth on low carbohydrate concentrations (1996)

Alison Kay Heather is an Australian synthetic and molecular biologist at the University of Otago and founder of Insitugen.

== Academic career ==
After obtaining her PhD in 1996 from the University of Sydney for a thesis entitled Between feast and famine: adaptation of Escherichia coli to growth on low carbohydrate concentrations, Heather moved to the Sydney Heart Research Institute and University of Technology Sydney, and then to the University of Otago, rising to full professor. Heather is the Founder and Chief Scientific Officer of Insitugen.

Heather competes in ultra-long-distance running events and triathlons. Her area of specialisation is the effect of sex hormones on non-reproductive tissues, which includes use of sex hormones and related substances in sports doping. Heather's company Insitugen provides rapid hormone screening in the sporting, veterinary, and environmental fields.

== Selected works ==
- Liu, Peter Y., Alison K. Death, and David J. Handelsman. "Androgens and cardiovascular disease." Endocrine reviews 24, no. 3 (2003): 313–340.
- Death, Alison K., Elizabeth J. Fisher, Kristine CY McGrath, and Dennis K. Yue. "High glucose alters matrix metalloproteinase expression in two key vascular cells: potential impact on atherosclerosis in diabetes." Atherosclerosis 168, no. 2 (2003): 263–269.
- Fryirs, Michelle A., Philip J. Barter, Mathiyalagan Appavoo, Bernard E. Tuch, Fatiha Tabet, Alison K. Heather, and Kerry-Anne Rye. "Effects of high-density lipoproteins on pancreatic β-cell insulin secretion." Arteriosclerosis, thrombosis, and vascular biology 30, no. 8 (2010): 1642–1648.
- McCrohon, Jane A., Alison K. Death, Shirley Nakhla, Wendy Jessup, David J. Handelsman, Keith K. Stanley, and David S. Celermajer. "Androgen receptor expression is greater in macrophages from male than from female donors: a sex difference with implications for atherogenesis." Circulation 101, no. 3 (2000): 224–226.
- Mclennan, Susan V., Elizabeth Fisher, Sally Y. Martell, Alison K. Death, Paul F. Williams, J. Guy Lyons, and Dennis K. Yue. "Effects of glucose on matrix metalloproteinase and plasmin activities in mesangial cells: possible role in diabetic nephropathy." Kidney International 58 (2000): S81-S87.
