= Health (journal) =

- Discipline: Healthcare
- Language: English
- Edited by: Michael Traynor

Publication details
- History: 1997–present
- Publisher: SAGE Publications
- Frequency: Bimonthly
- Impact factor: 1.324 (2013)

Standard abbreviations
- ISO 4: Health

Indexing
- ISSN: 1363-4593 (print); 1461-7196 (web)
- LCCN: 97652924
- OCLC no.: 300289269

Links
- Journal homepage; Online access; Online archive

Health: An Interdisciplinary Journal for the Social Study of Health, Illness and Medicine is a bimonthly peer-reviewed healthcare journal that covers research in the fields of health and the social sciences. The journal was established in 1997 with Alan Radley (Loughborough University) as founding editor and is published by SAGE Publications. The editor-in-chief is Michael Traynor (Middlesex University).

== Abstracting and indexing ==
Health is abstracted and indexed in Scopus and the Social Sciences Citation Index. According to the Journal Citation Reports, its 2013 impact factor is 1.324, ranking it 70 out of 136 journals in the category "Public, Environmental & Occupational Health (SSCI)" and 18 out of 37 journals in the category "Social Sciences, Biomedical".
