= Keri Lawson-Te Aho =

New Zealand academic

Keri Rose Lawson-Te Aho is a New Zealand academic specialising in studying mental health issues and suicide amongst New Zealand's Māori people.

== Biography ==
In 1995–96, Lawson-Te Aho was a Fulbright scholar and visiting research fellow at the East-West Center in Hawaii. She later travelled in indigenous communities in Alaska and other parts of North America, working on suicide prevention and tribal self-determination projects. In 2013, she completed a PhD at Victoria University of Wellington on Māori suicide prevention.

Lawson-Te Aho is a lecturer at the University of Otago's Wellington School of Medicine.
