= Dawn Elder (paediatrician) =

New Zealand academic

- Born: Dawn Elizabeth Elder
- Education: University of Otago
- Scientific career
- Fields: Sudden infant death syndrome and breathing problems in babies and children
- Workplaces: University of Otago
- Thesis: Respiratory variability in infants and children (2010)

Dawn Elizabeth Elder is a New Zealand academic and paediatrician. As of 2018, she is a full professor and head of department at the University of Otago, Wellington.

== Early life and family ==
Elder is the daughter of Ivan Elder, who served as mayor of Gore in the 1970s. She was educated at Gore High School.

== Academic career ==
After a 2010 PhD titled Respiratory variability in infants and children at the University of Otago, Elder rose to full professor in 2012.

Much of Elder's research involves breathing issues in babies and children, but she is involved on other areas of paediatrics as well.

== Selected works ==
- Galland, Barbara C., Barry J. Taylor, Dawn E. Elder, and Peter Herbison. "Normal sleep patterns in infants and children: a systematic review of observational studies." Sleep Medicine Reviews 16, no. 3 (2012): 213–222.
- Elder, Dawn E., Ronald Hagan, Sharon F. Evans, Helen R. Benninger, and Noel P. French. "Recurrent wheezing in very preterm infants." Archives of Disease in Childhood-Fetal and Neonatal Edition 74, no. 3 (1996): F165–F171.
- Darlow, Brian A., Christine C. Winterbourn, Terrie E. Inder, Patrick J. Graham, Jane E. Harding, Philip J. Weston, Nicola C. Austin et al. "The effect of selenium supplementation on outcome in very low birth weight infants: a randomized controlled trial." The Journal of Pediatrics 136, no. 4 (2000): 473–480.
- Elder, Dawn E., Angela J. Campbell, and Dorota A. Doherty. "Prone or supine for infants with chronic lung disease at neonatal discharge?." Journal of Paediatrics and Child Health 41, no. 4 (2005): 180–185.
- Galland, Barbara, Karen Spruyt, Patrick Dawes, Philippa S. McDowall, Dawn Elder, and Elizabeth Schaughency. "Sleep disordered breathing and academic performance: a meta-analysis." Pediatrics (2015): peds-2015.
- Elder, Dawn E. "Interpretation of anogenital findings in the living child: Implications for the paediatric forensic autopsy." Journal of Forensic and Legal Medicine 14, no. 8 (2007): 482–488.
