= Supportive Care in Cancer =

- Discipline: Oncology
- Language: English
- Edited by: Fred Ashbury

Publication details
- History: 1993-present
- Publisher: Springer Science+Business Media on behalf of the Multinational Association of Supportive Care in Cancer
- Frequency: Monthly
- Impact factor: 2.698 (2016)

Standard abbreviations
- ISO 4: Support. Care Cancer

Indexing
- ISSN: 0941-4355 (print); 1433-7339 (web)
- OCLC no.: 858842122

Links
- Journal homepage; Online archive

Supportive Care in Cancer is a monthly peer-reviewed medical journal covering research on cancer care. It is published by Springer Science+Business Media on behalf of the Multinational Association of Supportive Care in Cancer.

According to the Journal Citation Reports, the journal has a 2013 impact factor of 2.495.

In 2016, Supportive Care in Cancer published an article by Milena Penkowa, who had previously been convicted of fraud and been found guilty of scientific misconduct. The article (Bismuth adjuvant ameliorates adverse effects of high-dose chemotherapy in patients with multiple myeloma and malignant lymphoma undergoing autologous stem cell transplantation: a randomised, double-blind, prospective pilot study) contained blatant and obvious scientific errors, verified as errors by multiple experts. For example, the article gives a p-value of 0.0001, where a simple calculation check reveals the p-value to be 0.41. In spite of that, and to the incredulousness of Professor Peter Reinhard Hansen, the supposedly peer-reviewed article has not been retracted yet as of September 2019, two years after Supportive Care in Cancer itself had published a letter to the editor detailing the errors. A retraction notice was published by Supportive Care in Cancer in October 2020.
