= Family Practice (journal) =

- Discipline: family medicine, general practice, primary care medicine
- Language: English
- Edited by: Goutham Rao

Publication details
- History: 1984-present
- Publisher: Oxford University Press
- Frequency: Bimonthly
- Impact factor: 2.267 (2020)

Standard abbreviations
- ISO 4: Fam. Pract.

Indexing
- ISSN: 0263-2136 (print); 1460-2229 (web)
- OCLC no.: 11330496

Links
- Journal homepage; Online access; http://fampra.oxfordjournals.org/content/by/year

Family Practice is a peer-reviewed medical journal published by Oxford University Press dealing with matters of interest to general practitioners. It includes a section entitled the WONCA news, published for the World Organization of National Colleges, Academies, and Academic Associations of General Practitioners/Family Physicians.

== Abstracting and indexing ==
The journal is abstracted and indexed in CAB Abstracts, Current Contents/Clinical Medicine, Embase, PubMed, and the Science Citation Index Expanded. According to the Journal Citation Reports, the journal has a 2020 impact factor of 2.267.
