= BMC Medical Education =

Academic journal published by BioMed Central

- Discipline: Medical education, curriculum development,continuing medical education
- Language: English
- Edited by: Kirsi Forsberg

Publication details
- History: 2001–present
- Publisher: BioMed Central
- Frequency: Continuous
- Open access: Yes
- License: Creative Commons Licenses
- Impact factor: 3.2 (2024)

Standard abbreviations
- ISO 4: BMC Med. Educ.

Indexing
- CODEN: BMEMCJ
- ISSN: 1472-6920
- LCCN: 2002243092
- OCLC no.: 47657387

Links
- Journal homepage; Online archive

BMC Medical Education is a peer-reviewed open-access medical journal that covers all aspects of education and training of healthcare professionals, including students and professionals across all levels of education. The journal has a special focus on curriculum development, evaluations of performance, assessment of training needs, and evidence-based medicine. It was established in 2001 and is published by BioMed Central. The editor-in-chief is Kirsi Forsberg (Springer Nature, Germany).

== Abstracting and indexing ==
The journal is abstracted and indexed in:

- Chemical Abstracts Service
- Current Contents/Clinical Medicine
- Current Contents/Social and Behavioral Sciences
- Directory of Open Access Journals
- EBSCO databases
- Index Medicus/MEDLINE/PubMed
- ProQuest databases
- Science Citation Index Expanded
- Scopus
- Social Sciences Citation Index

According to the Journal Citation Reports, the journal has a 2024 impact factor of 3.2.
