= Sue Pullon =

New Zealand public health researcher

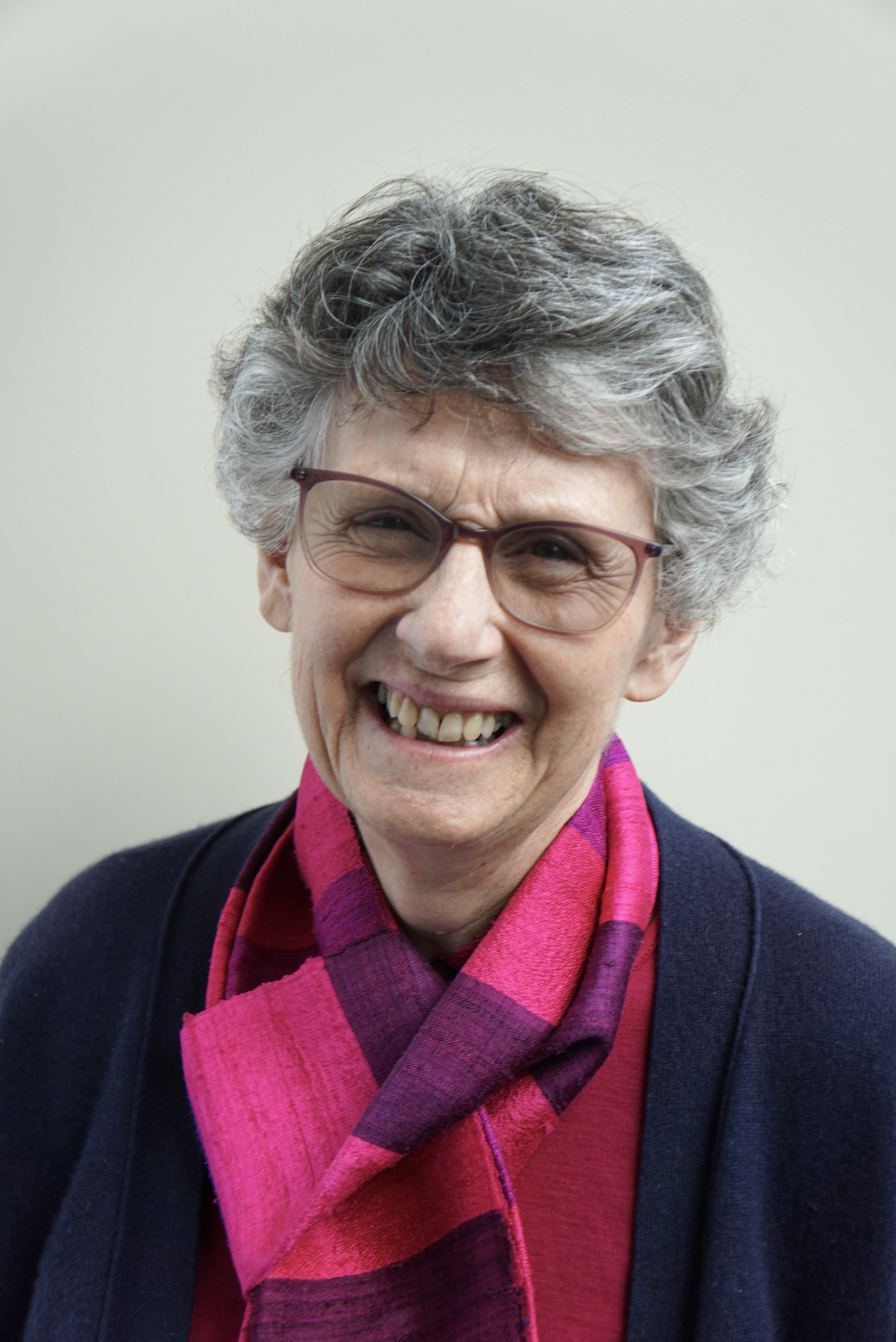
Pullon at the Otago Medical School 150th anniversary

Sue Pullon is a New Zealand public health researcher and practicing GP. She is the author of the New Zealand Pregnancy Book.

== Background ==
Pullon is a professor at the University of Otago's Wellington School of Medicine and Health Sciences. She was Head of the Department of Primary Health Care and General Practice from 2010 to 2017.

In 1980, Pullon became a medical officer with the Family Planning Association, under the leadership of Dame Margaret Sparrow. Pullon worked as a GP for 32 years before moving to a full-time position with the University of Otago in 2011. She was promoted to Professor in 2017.

The New Zealand Pregnancy Book was first published in 1991 and was the first comprehensive guide for New Zealand women on the topics of reproductive health, pregnancy and new babies. A second edition was published in 1999 and a third edition in 2008 included midwife Cheryl Benn as a co-author.

In 2009, Pullon was awarded a Distinguished Fellowship of the Royal New Zealand College of General Practitioners.
