= Scott Macfarlane (oncologist) =

New Zealand paediatric oncologist

Sir Scott Macfarlane KNZM
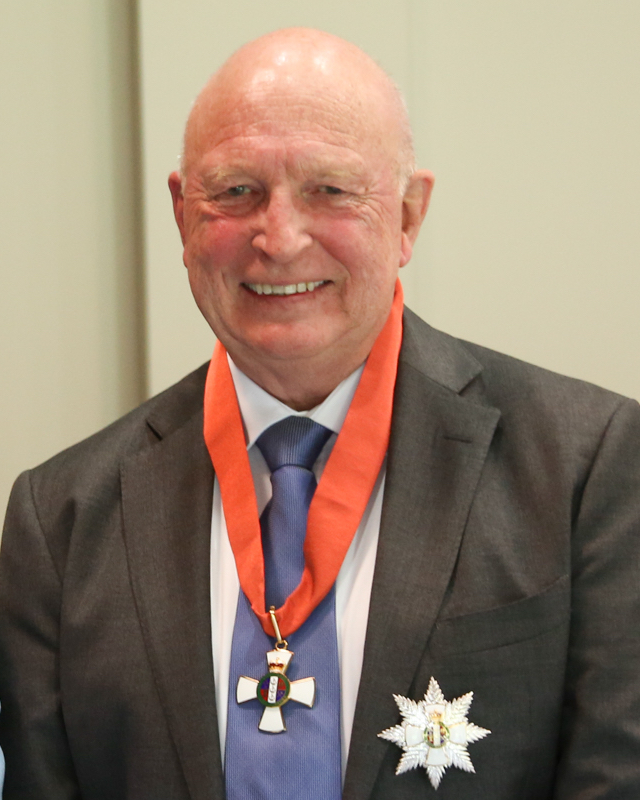
- Macfarlane in 2024
- Born: Scott Duncan Macfarlane
- Education: University of Auckland
- Occupation: Paediatric oncologist

Sir Scott Duncan Macfarlane KNZM is a New Zealand paediatric oncologist. Over his career, he was intimately involved in the development of a nationally coordinated approach to child cancer, which saw the survival rate for child cancer in New Zealand improve from 50 percent to better than 80 percent.

Macfarlane studied medicine at the University of Auckland, graduating MB ChB in 1977. He undertook further training in Melbourne, and began his paediatrics career at Waikato Hospital in 1986. Ten years later, he moved to Starship Hospital in Auckland, rising to become clinical director of Starship. He was particularly involved in the establishment of the National Child Cancer Network in 2011, heading the body until retiring in November 2021.

Macfarlane served as Oceania president of the International Society for Paediatric Oncology and president of the Australia New Zealand Children's Haematology Oncology Group. In 2015, he was made a life member of the Child Cancer Foundation.

In the 2024 New Year Honours, Macfarlane was appointed a Knight Companion of the New Zealand Order of Merit, for services to health.
