= Master of Health Science =

Academic degree

The Master of Health Science (MHS/M.H.Sc.) degree is a specialized master's degree. Depending on the department and specific area of study, the MHS degree provides opportunities for advanced study and research (academic MHS programs) or prepares individuals to begin or advance their careers as public health professionals (professional MHS programs). They offer an alternative to the Master of Public Health (MPH) degree for students desiring more focused skills.
