= 2021 New Year Honours (New Zealand) =

Awards list for New Zealand

- Previous: 2020 Queen's Birthday Honours; Next: 2021 Queen's Birthday Honours
- Type: New Zealand royal honours: Order of New Zealand; New Zealand Order of Merit; Queen's Service Order; Queen's Service Medal; New Zealand Antarctic Medal; New Zealand Distinguished Service Decoration
- Date: 31 December 2020
- Country: New Zealand
- Total recipients: 154

The 2021 New Year Honours in New Zealand were appointments by Elizabeth II in her right as Queen of New Zealand, on the advice of the New Zealand government, to various orders and honours to reward and highlight good works by New Zealanders, and to celebrate the passing of 2020 and the beginning of 2021. They were announced on 31 December 2020.

The recipients of honours are displayed here as they were styled before their new honour.

== Order of New Zealand (ONZ) ==
Ordinary member

- Sir Mason Harold Durie KNZM – of Feilding. For services to New Zealand.
- Dame Mary Anne Salmond DBE – of Stanley Point. For services to New Zealand.
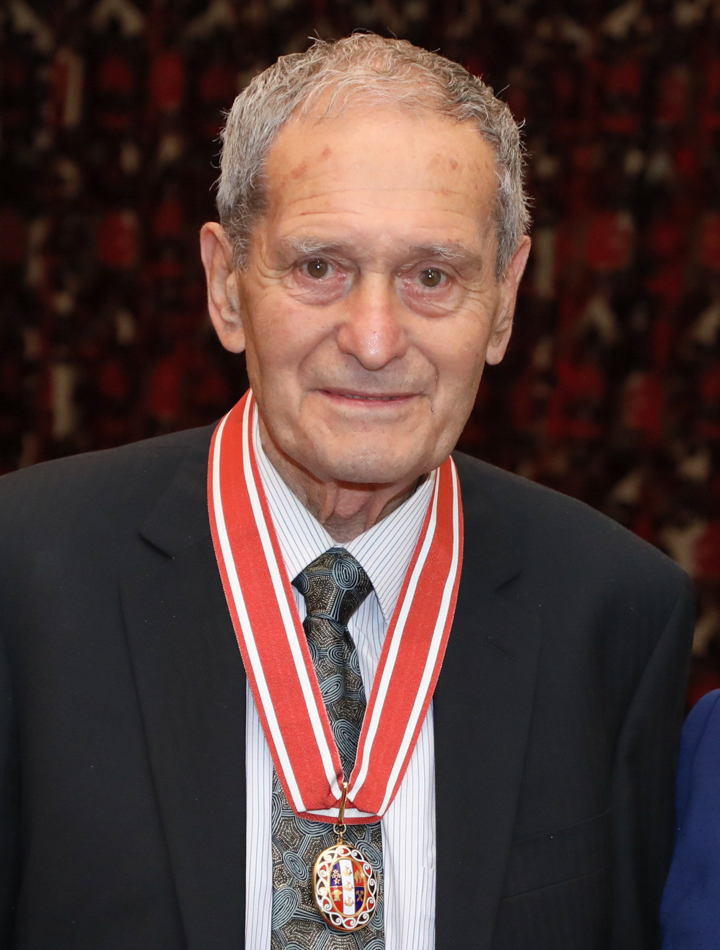
Sir Mason Durie

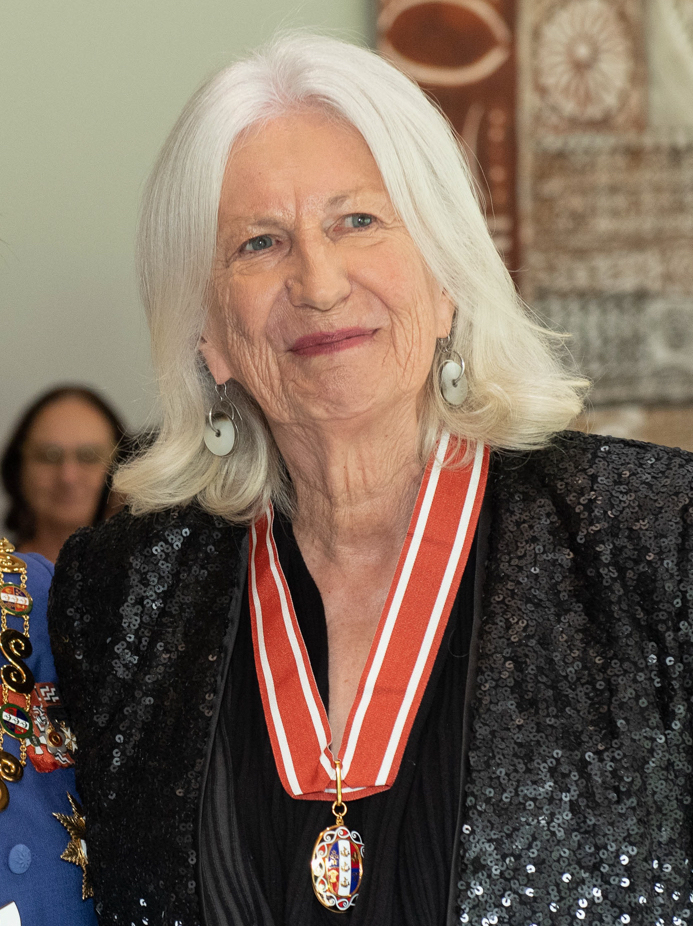
Dame Anne Salmond

== New Zealand Order of Merit ==
=== Dame Companion (DNZM) ===
- Professor Juliet Ann Gerrard – of Freemans Bay. For services to science.
- Professor Cynthia Alcyion Kiro – of Onerahi. For services to child wellbeing and education.

Honorary

- Suzanne Lee Snively ONZM – of Kelburn. For services to governance.
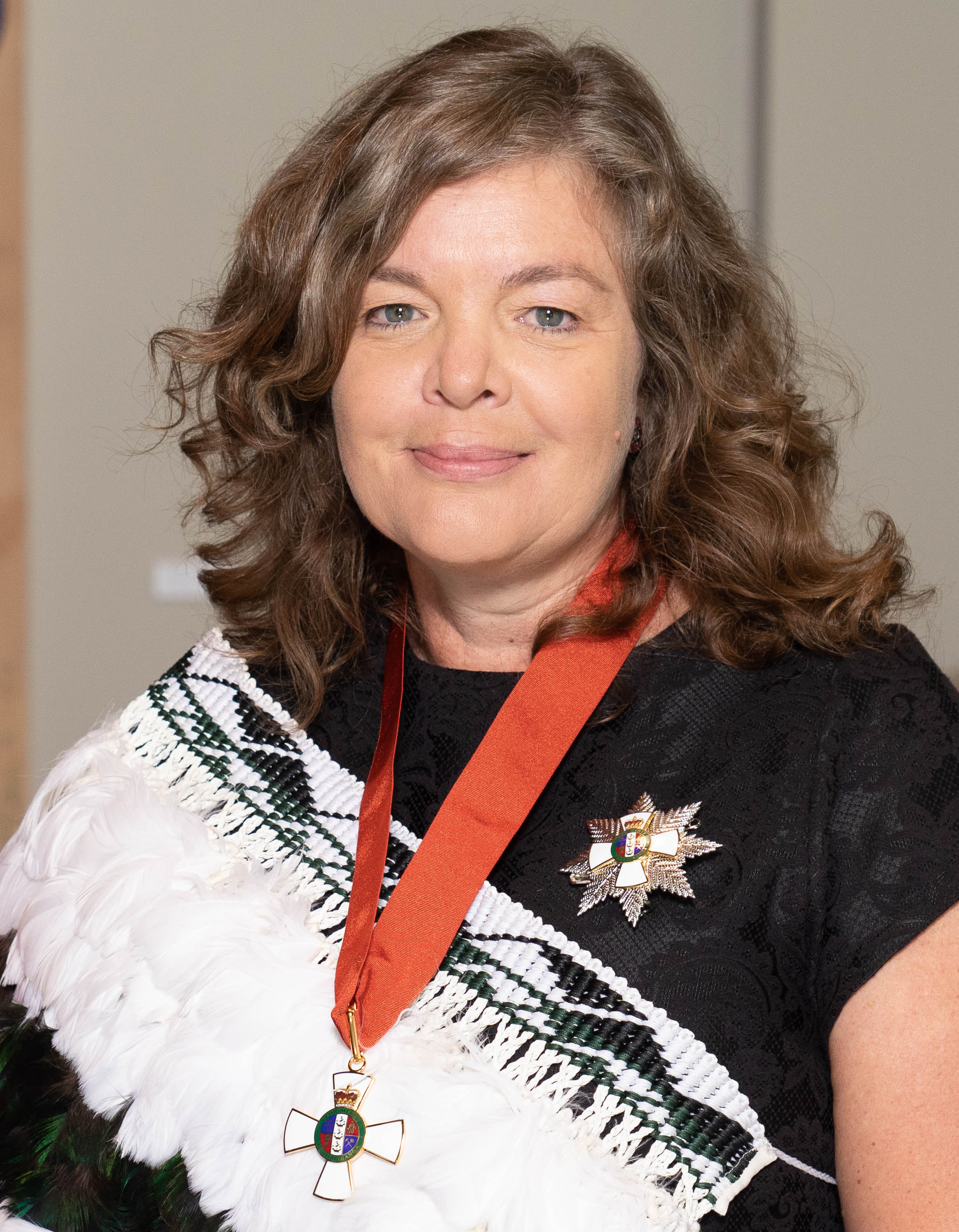
Dame Juliet Gerrard

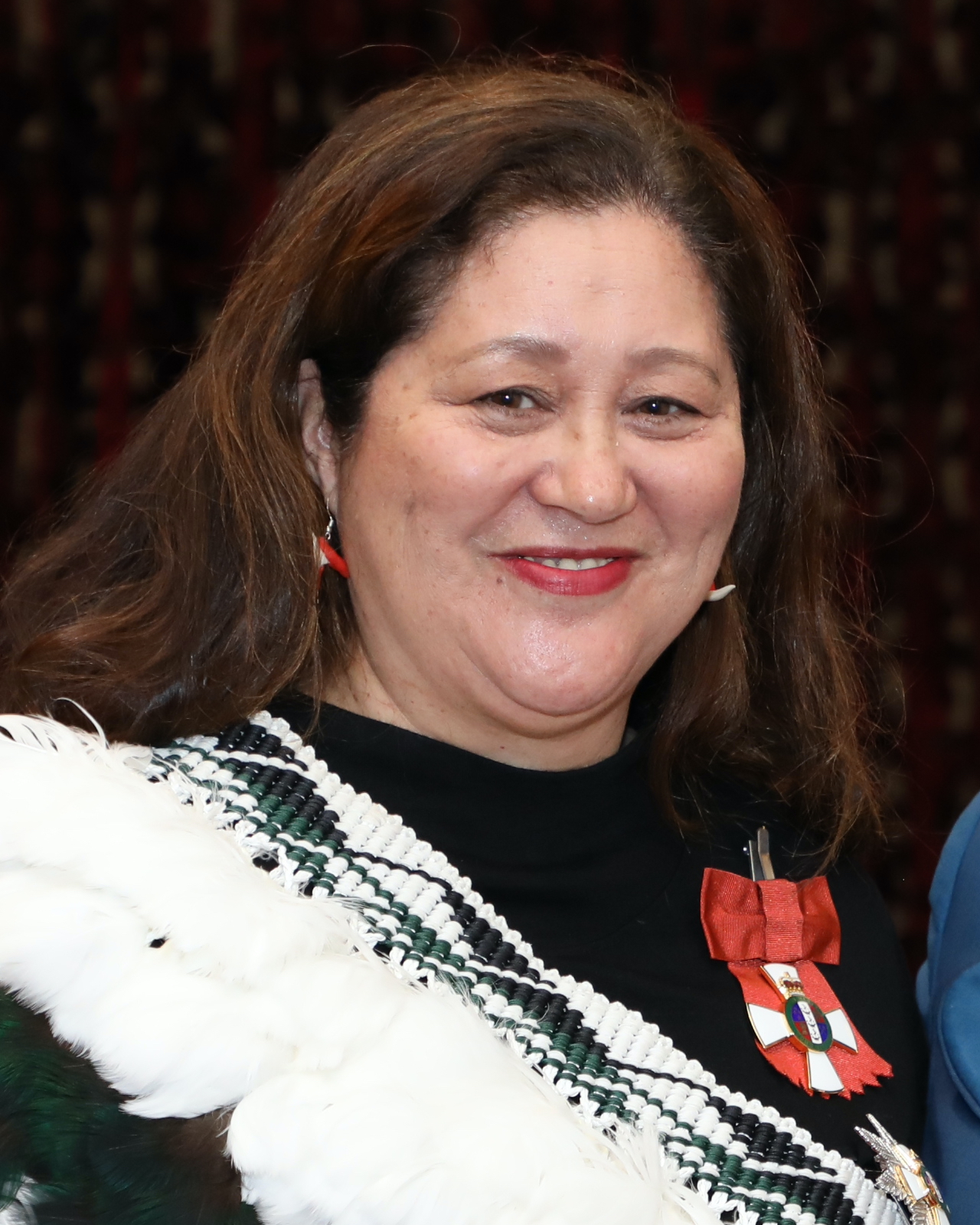
Dame Cindy Kiro

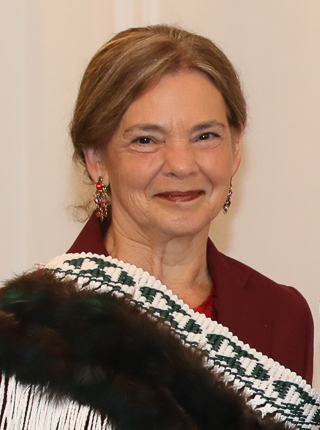
Suzanne Snively

=== Knight Companion (KNZM) ===
- The Right Honourable David Cunningham Carter – of Lyttelton. For services as a Member of Parliament and as Speaker of the House of Representatives.
- David Joseph Dobbyn ONZM – of Auckland. For services to music.
- Ian Lemuel Taylor CNZM – of Roslyn. For services to broadcasting, business and the community.
- Professor William Te Rangiua Temara CNZM – of Pukete. For services to Māori and education.
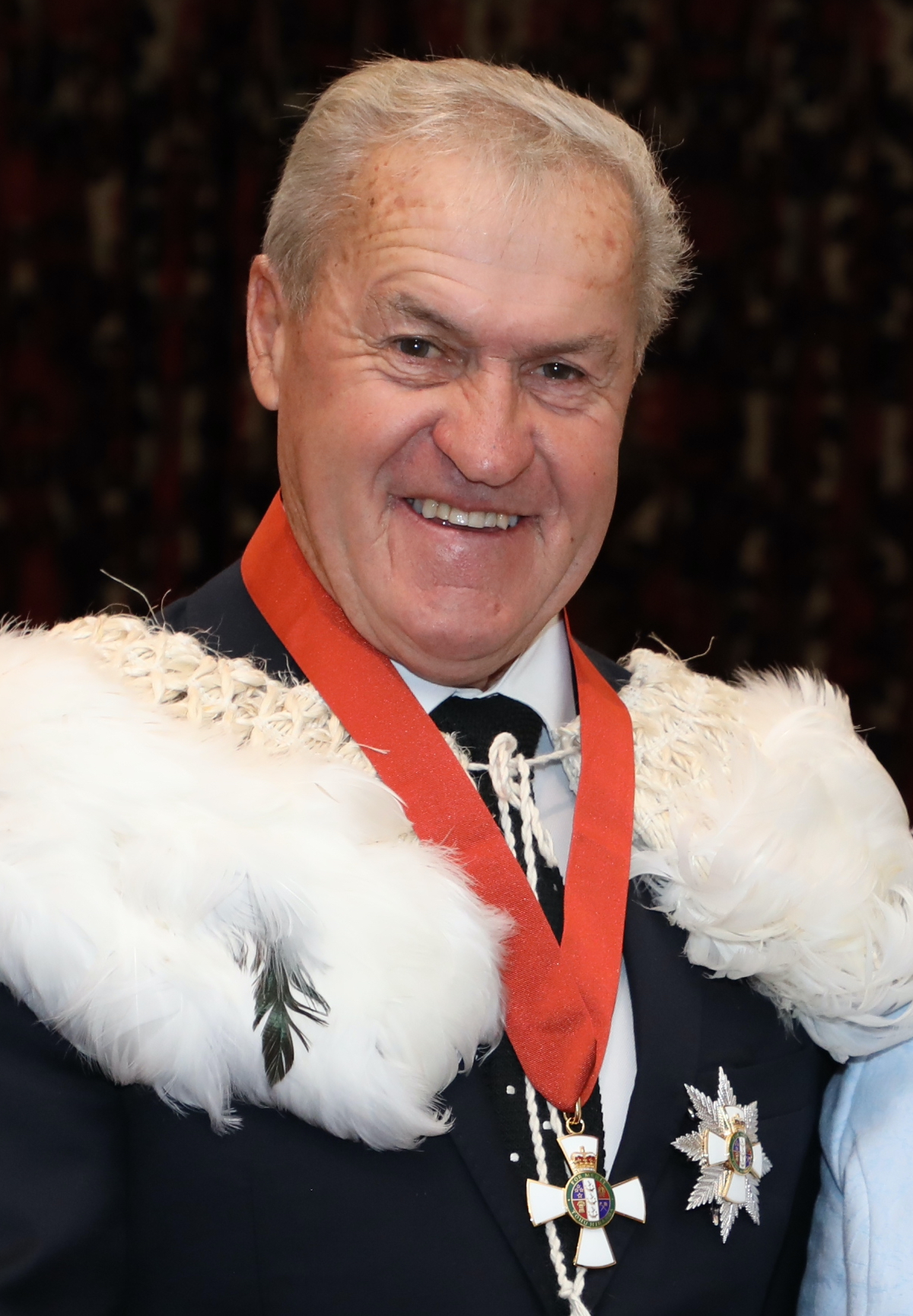
Sir David Carter

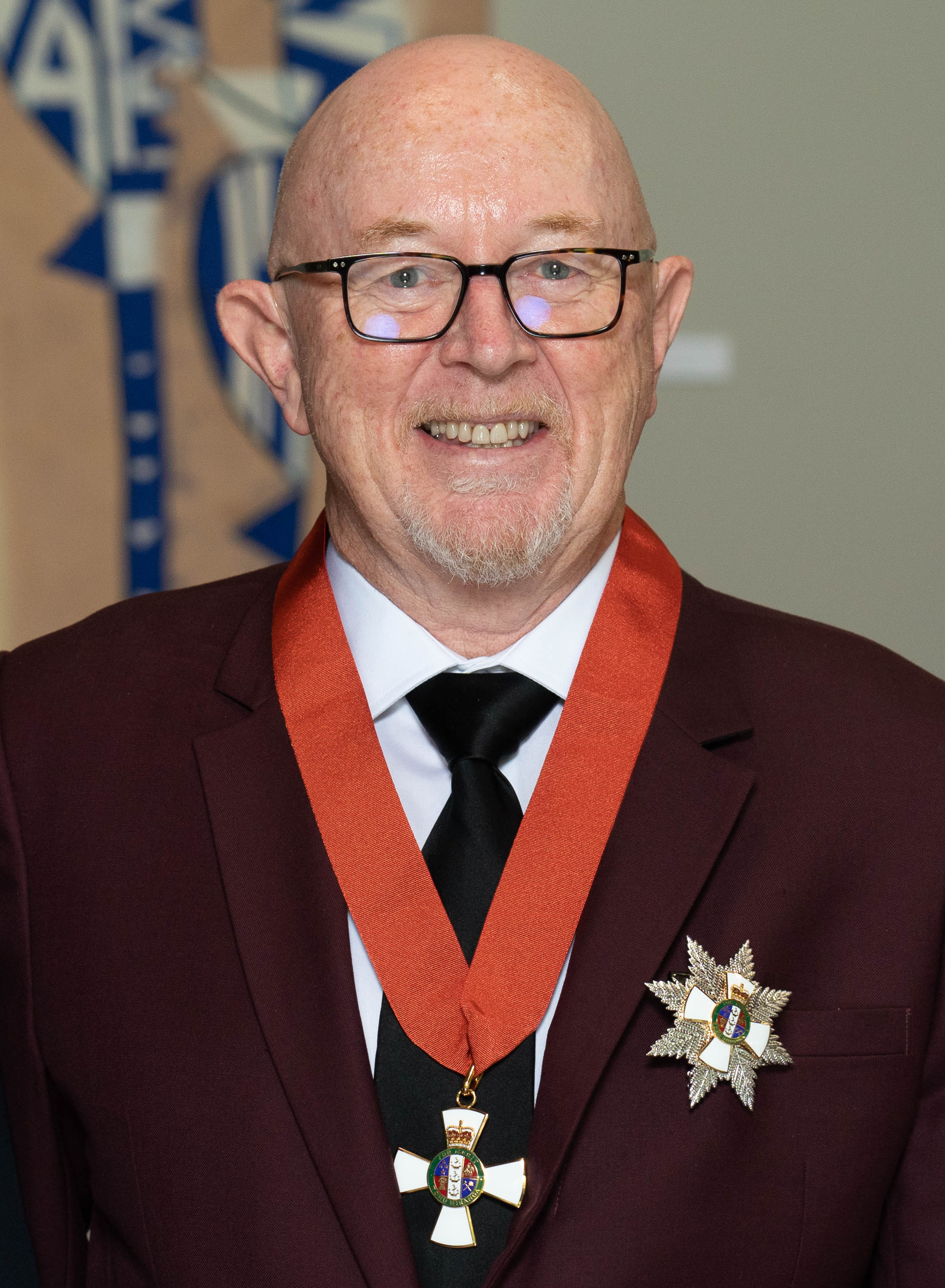
Sir Dave Dobbyn

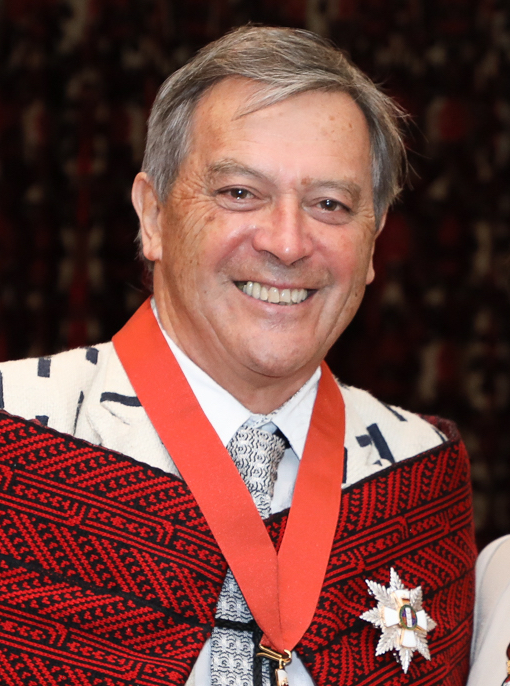
Sir Ian Taylor

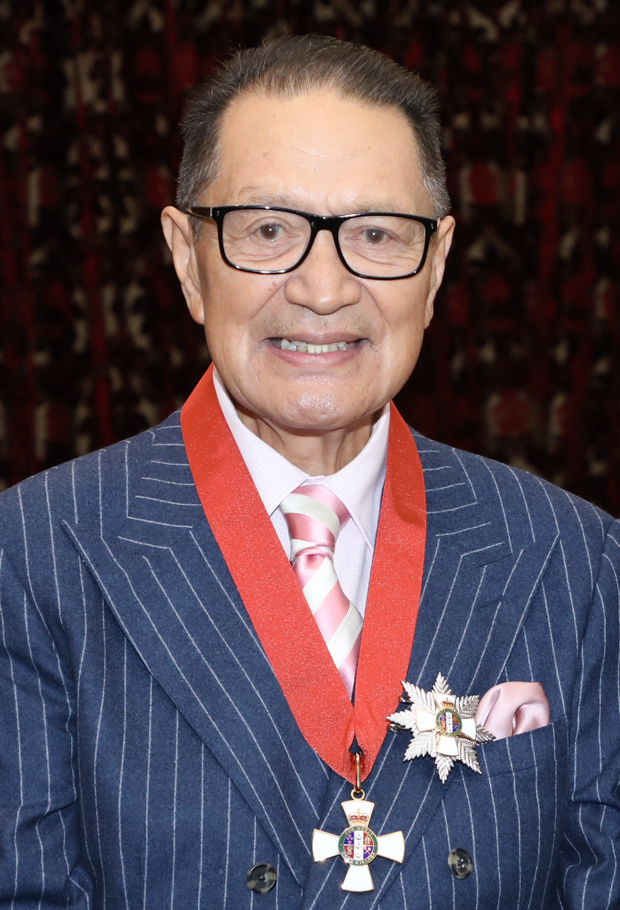
Sir Pou Temara

=== Companion (CNZM) ===
- Professor Stephen Thomas Chambers – of Cashmere. For services to infectious disease research.
- Suzanne Eleanor Chetwin – of Wadestown. For services to consumer rights.
- Dr Annabel Kirsten Finucane ONZM – of Remuera. For services to health, particularly paediatric heart surgery.
- Robert Ian Fyfe – of Takapuna. For services to business and tourism.
- Dr Stuart Peter Gowland QSO – of Stepneyville. For services to health and education.
- Michael Jon Hamilton – of Kennedys Bush. For services to marine engineering and business.
- Deborah Ann Hockley MNZM – of Sumner. For services to cricket.
- Distinguished Professor Philippa Lynne Howden-Chapman QSO – of Aro Valley. For services to public health.
- Albert Archibald Jelley OBE – of Green Bay. For services to athletics and the game of bridge.
- Dr David William Kerr – of Christchurch. For services to health and business.
- Dr Gerard David McSweeney QSO – of Haast. For services to conservation.
- Professor Emeritus Louise Frances Basford Nicholson – of Snells Beach. For services to neuroscience and education.
- The Honourable Anthony Penrose Randerson QC – of Epsom. For services to the judiciary.
- Distinguished Professor Ian Reginald Reid – of Mount Albert. For services to medicine.
- The Honourable Lynton Laurence Stevens QC – of Saint Heliers. For services to the judiciary and the community
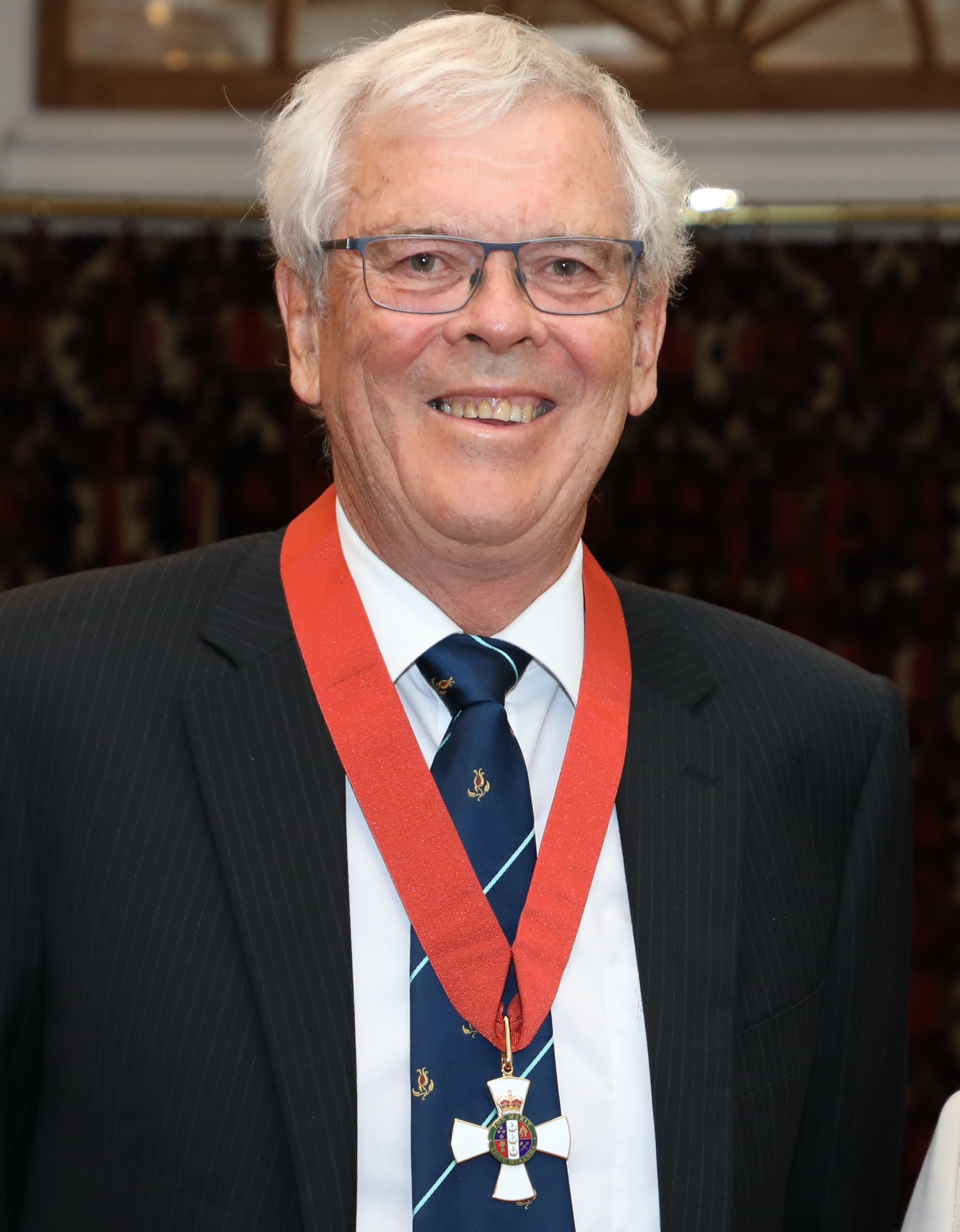
Stephen Chambers

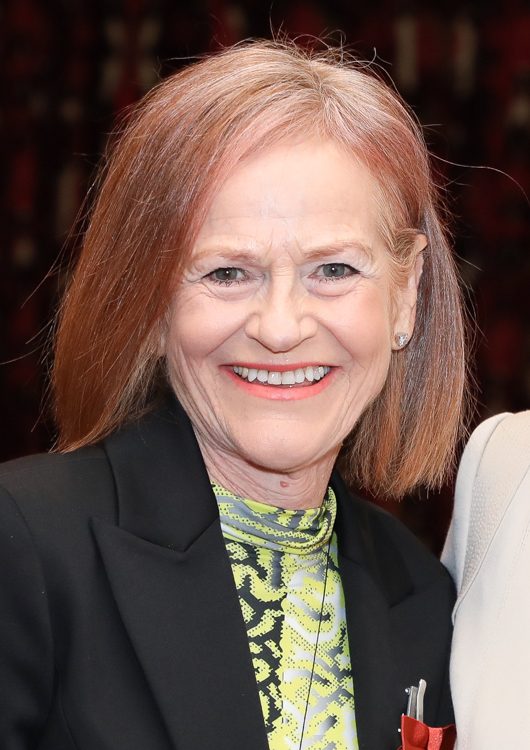
Sue Chetwin

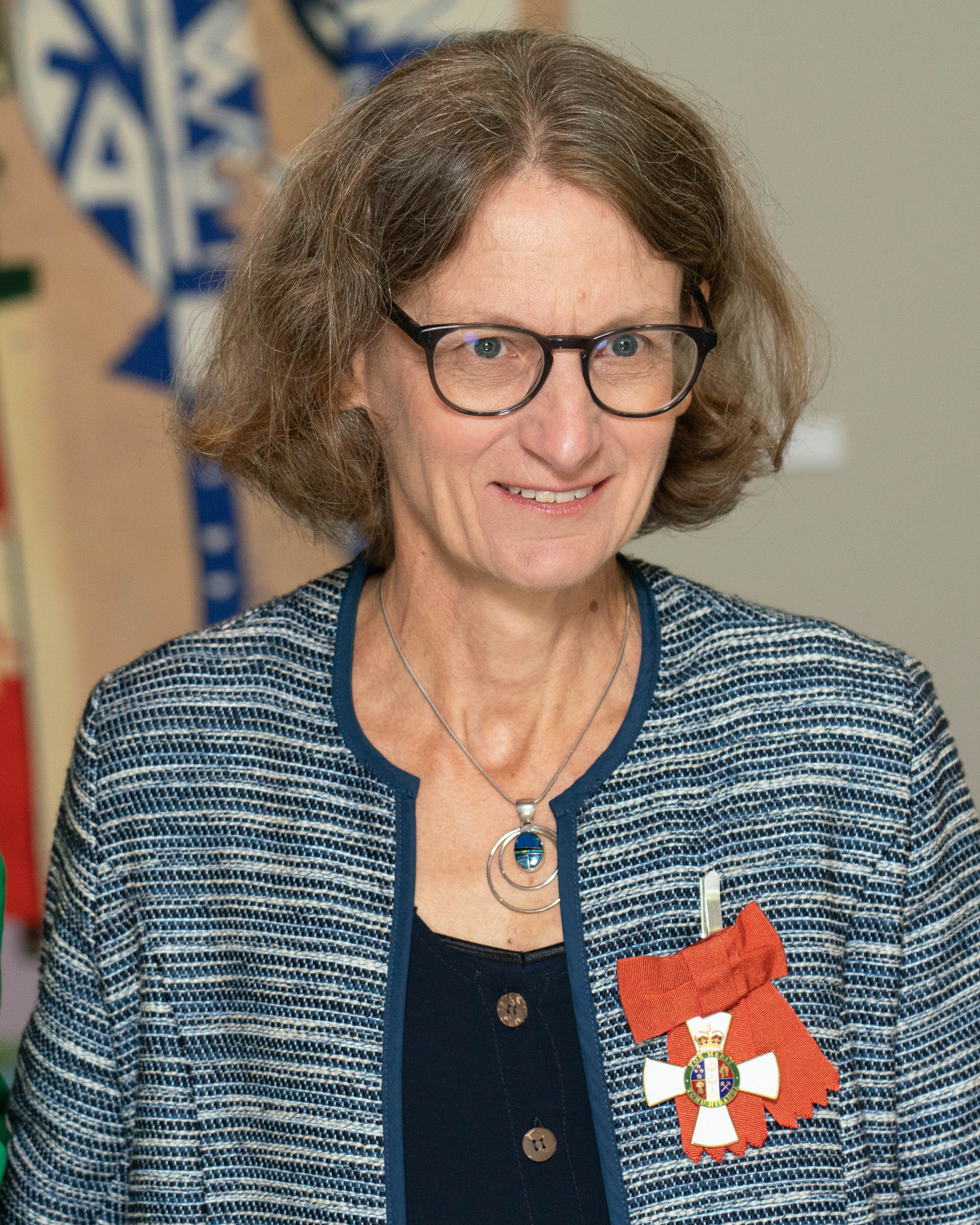
Kirsten Finucane

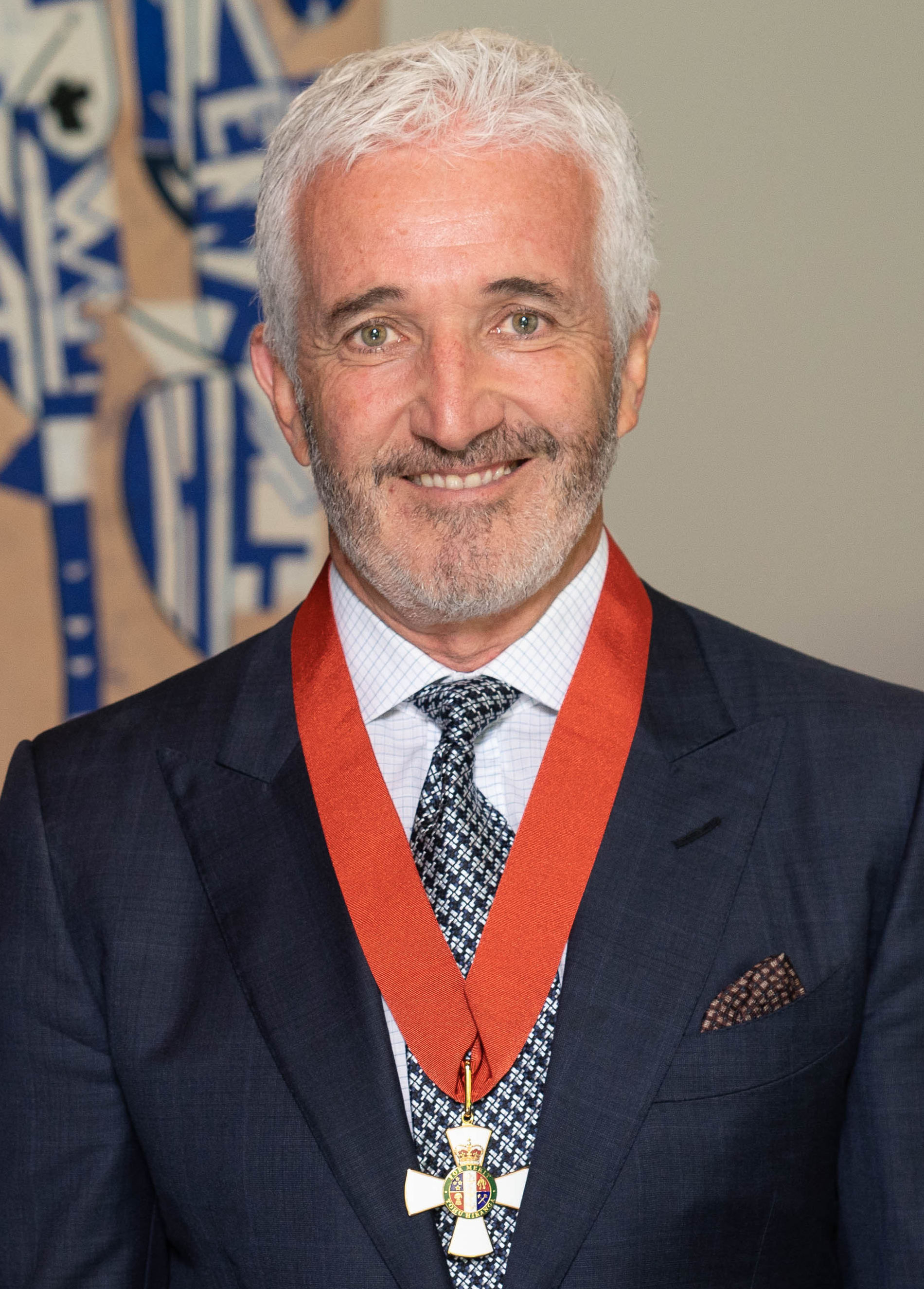
Rob Fyfe

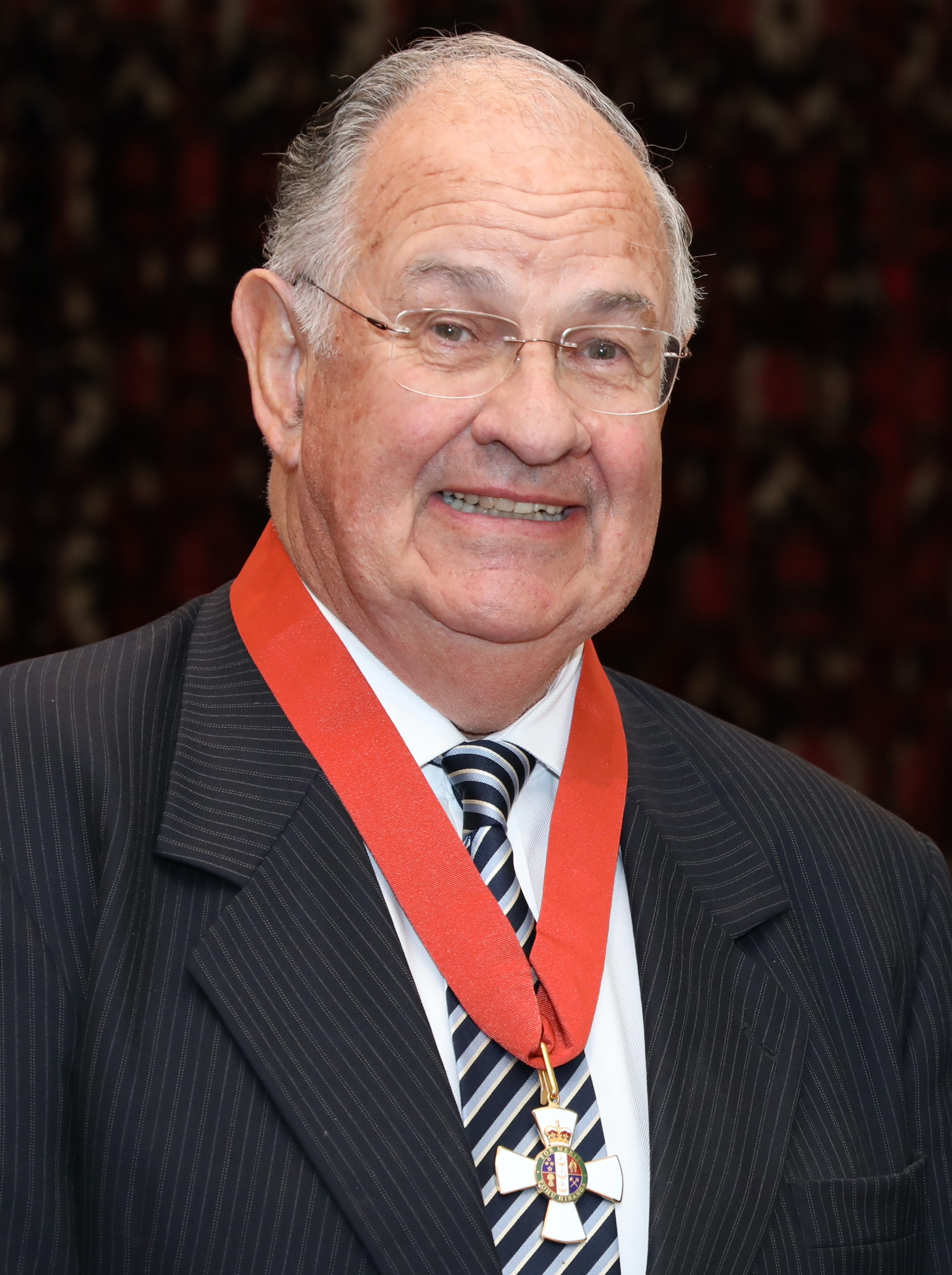
Stuart Gowland

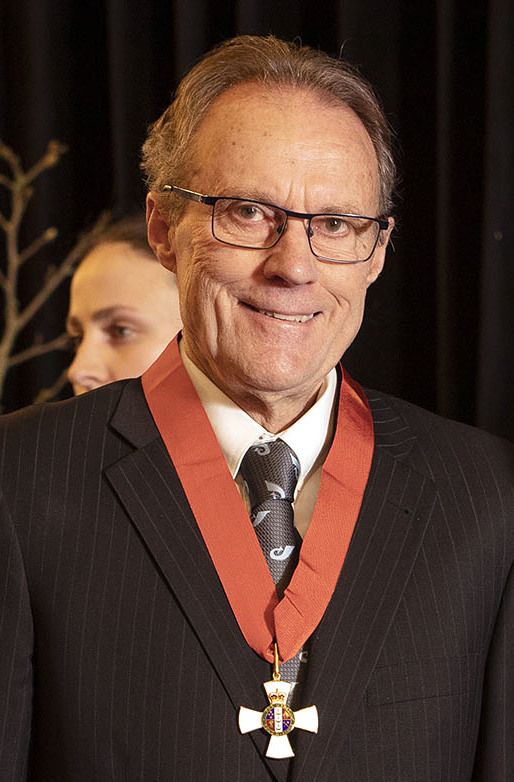
Mike Hamilton

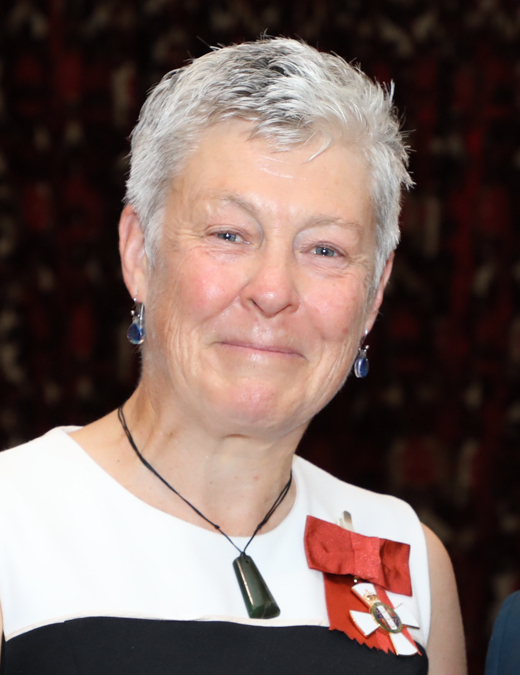
Debbie Hockley

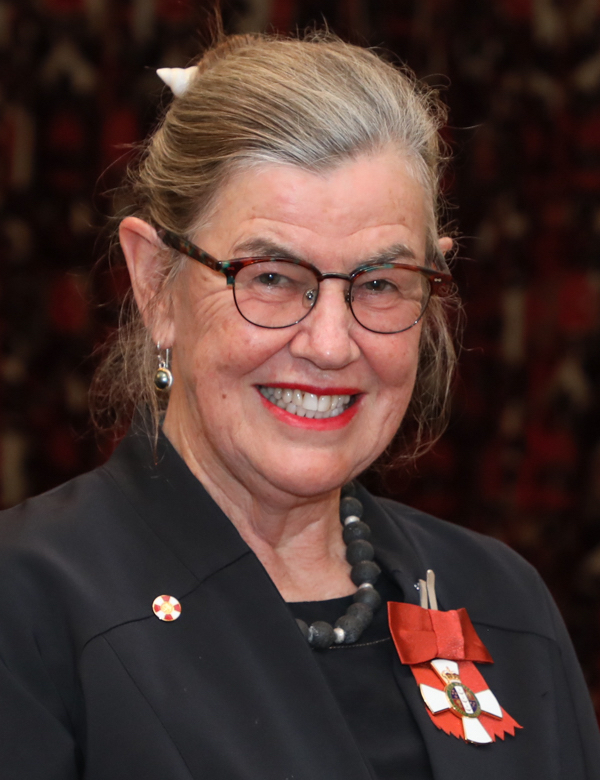
Philippa Howden-Chapman

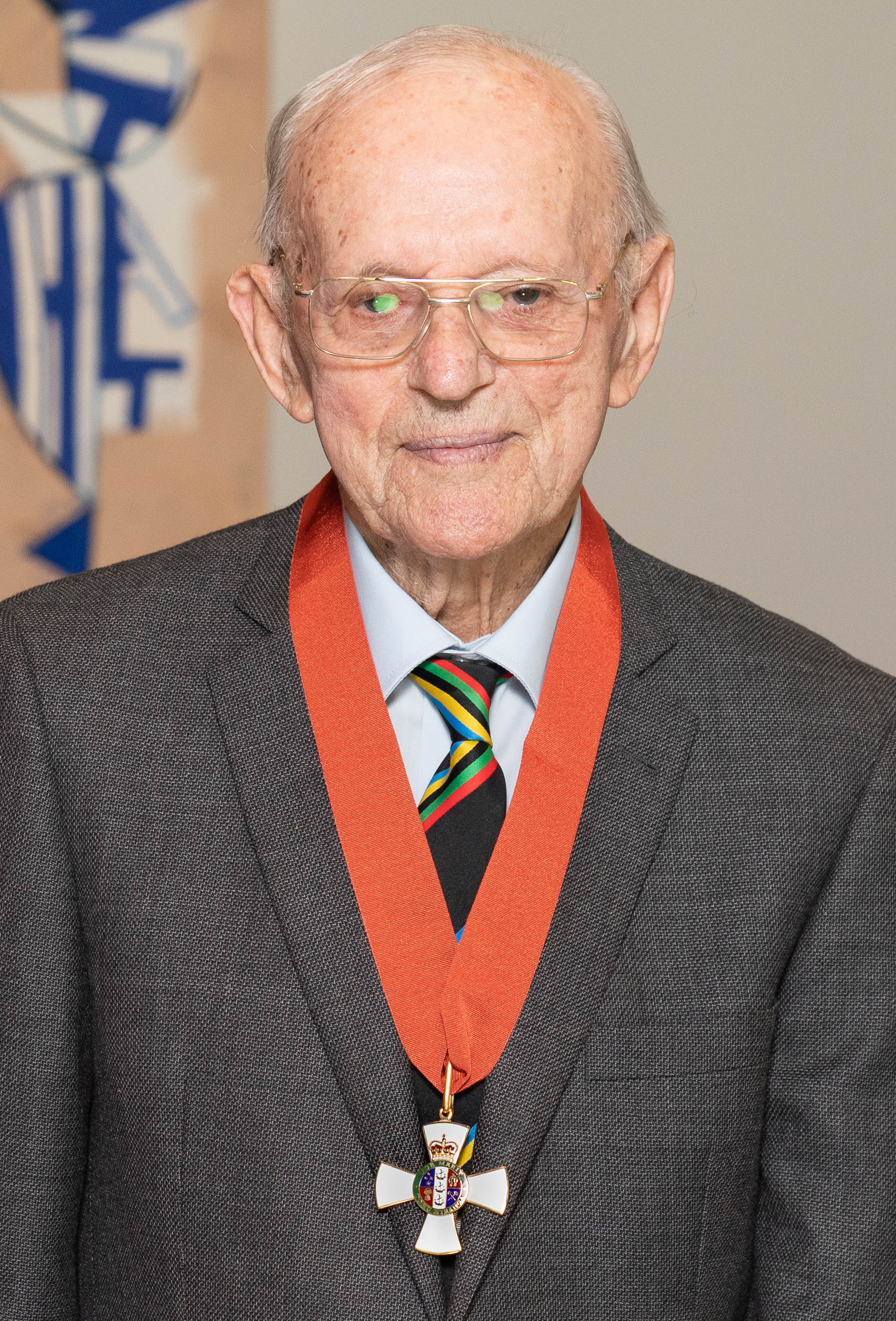
Arch Jelley

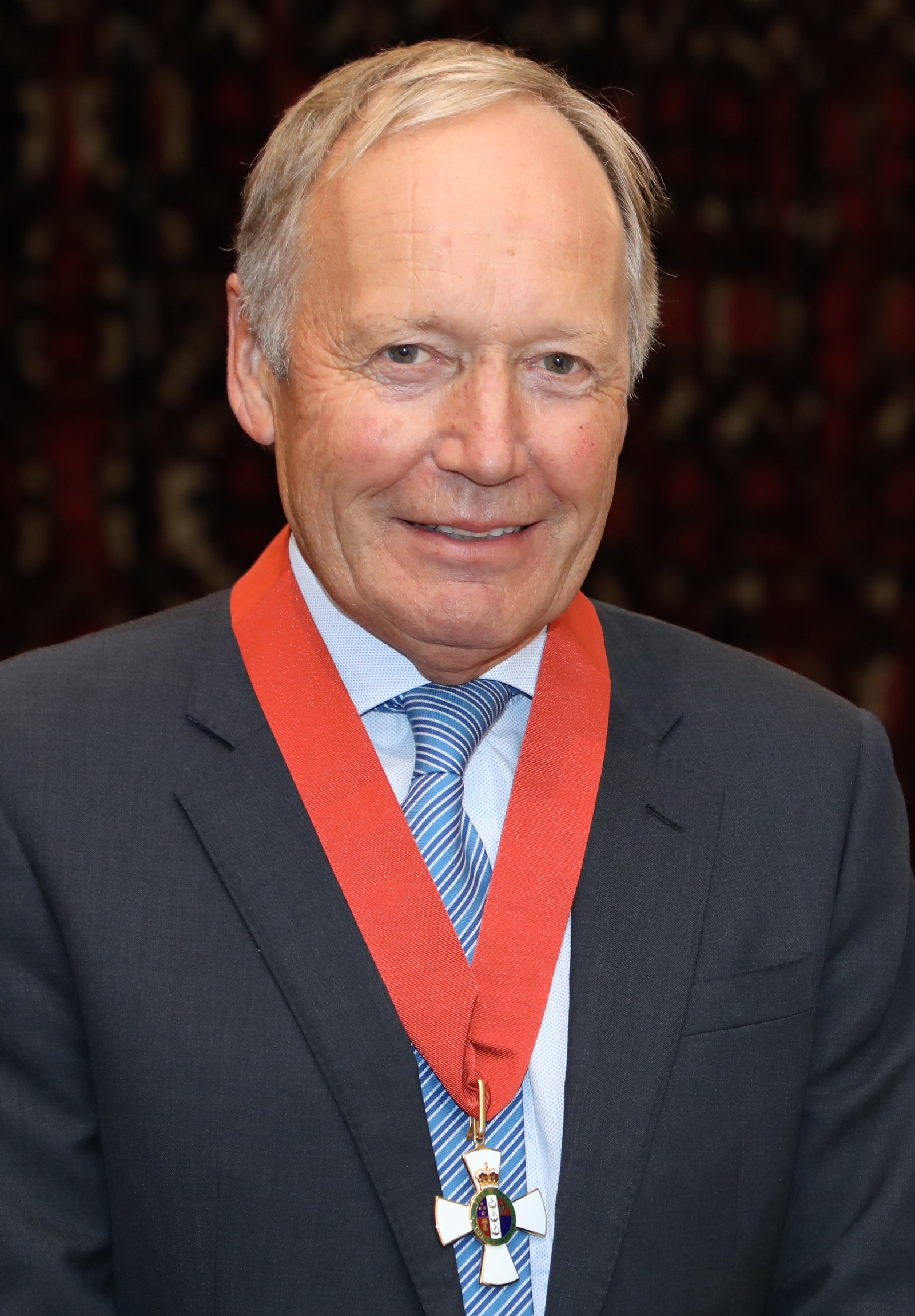
David Kerr

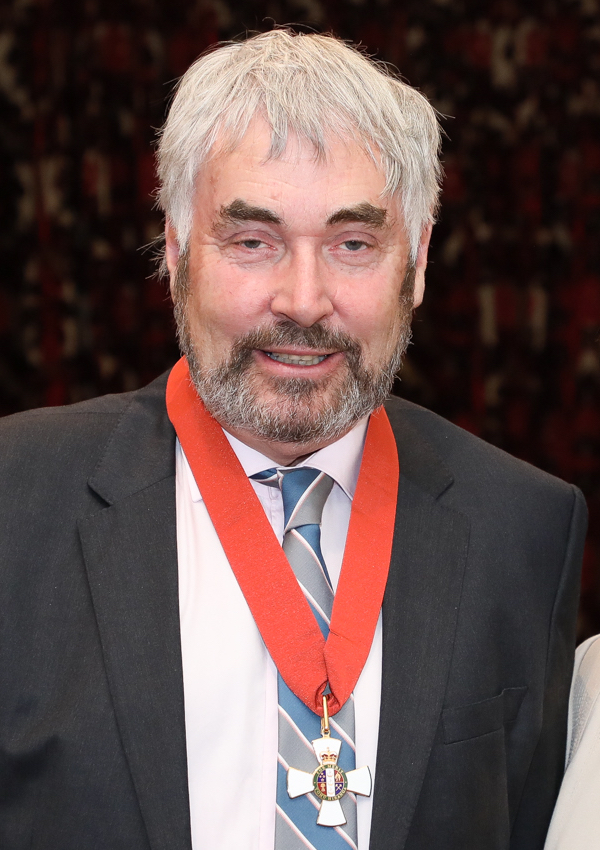
Gerry McSweeney

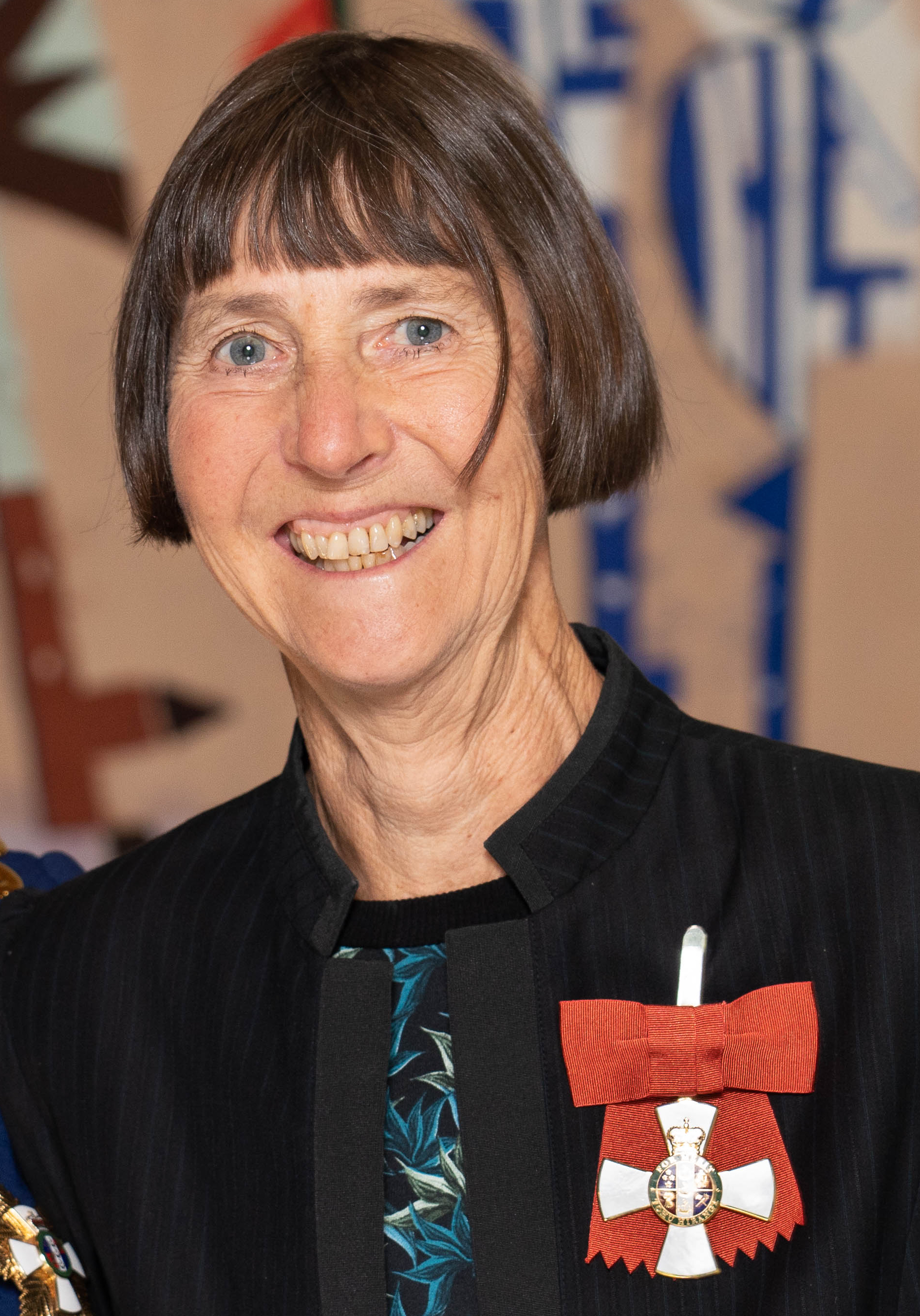
Louise Nicholson

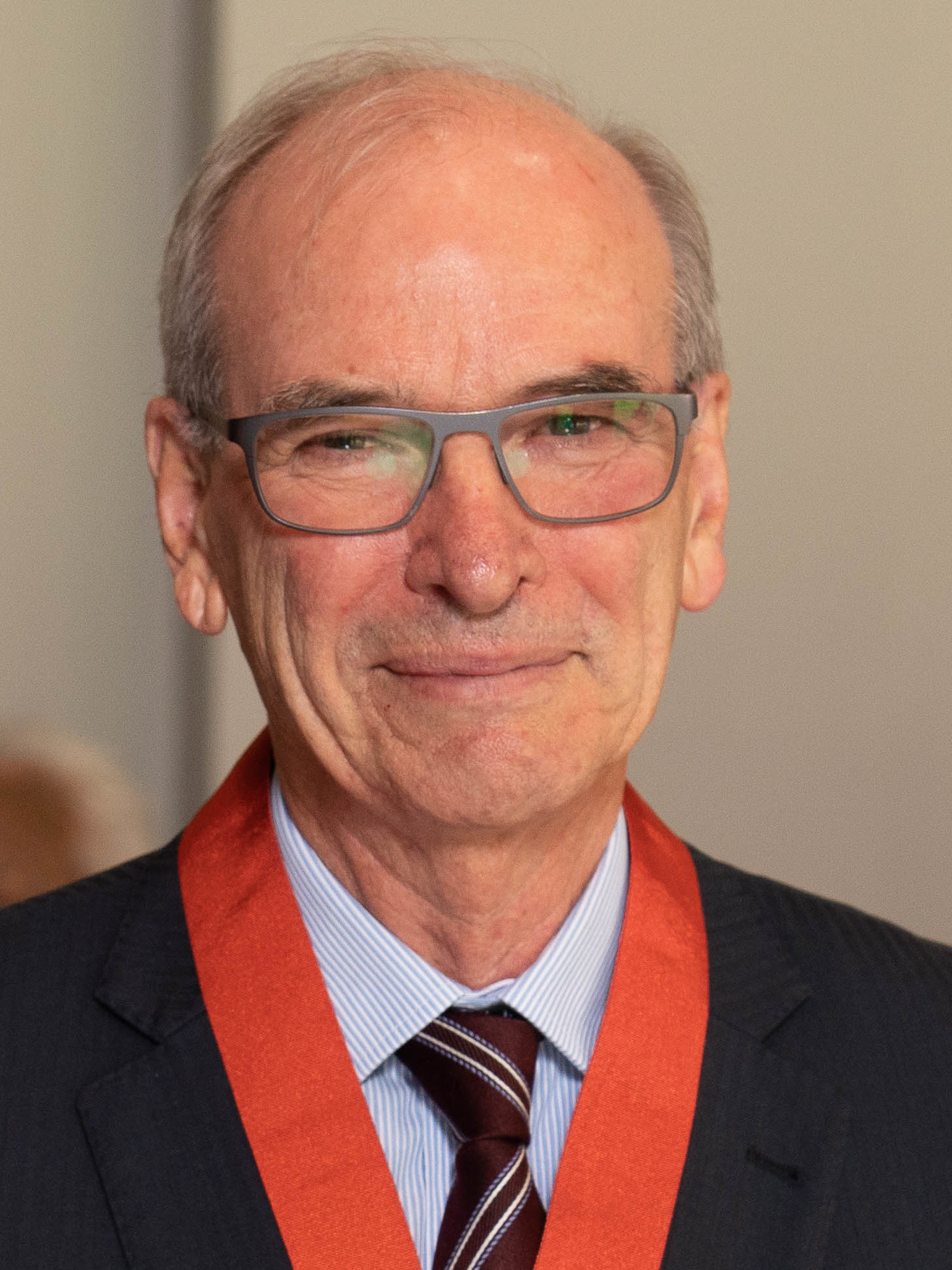
Tony Randerson

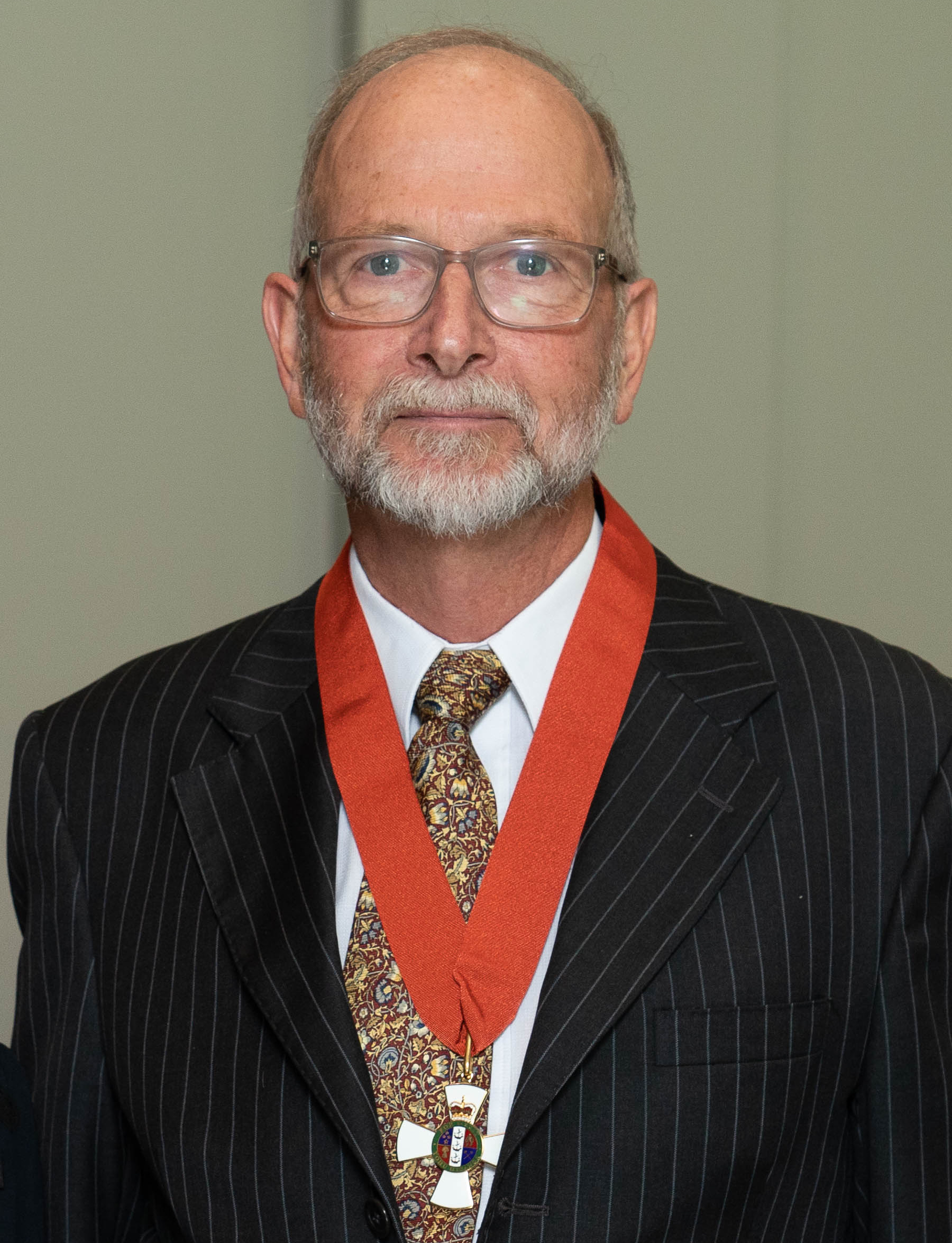
Ian Reid

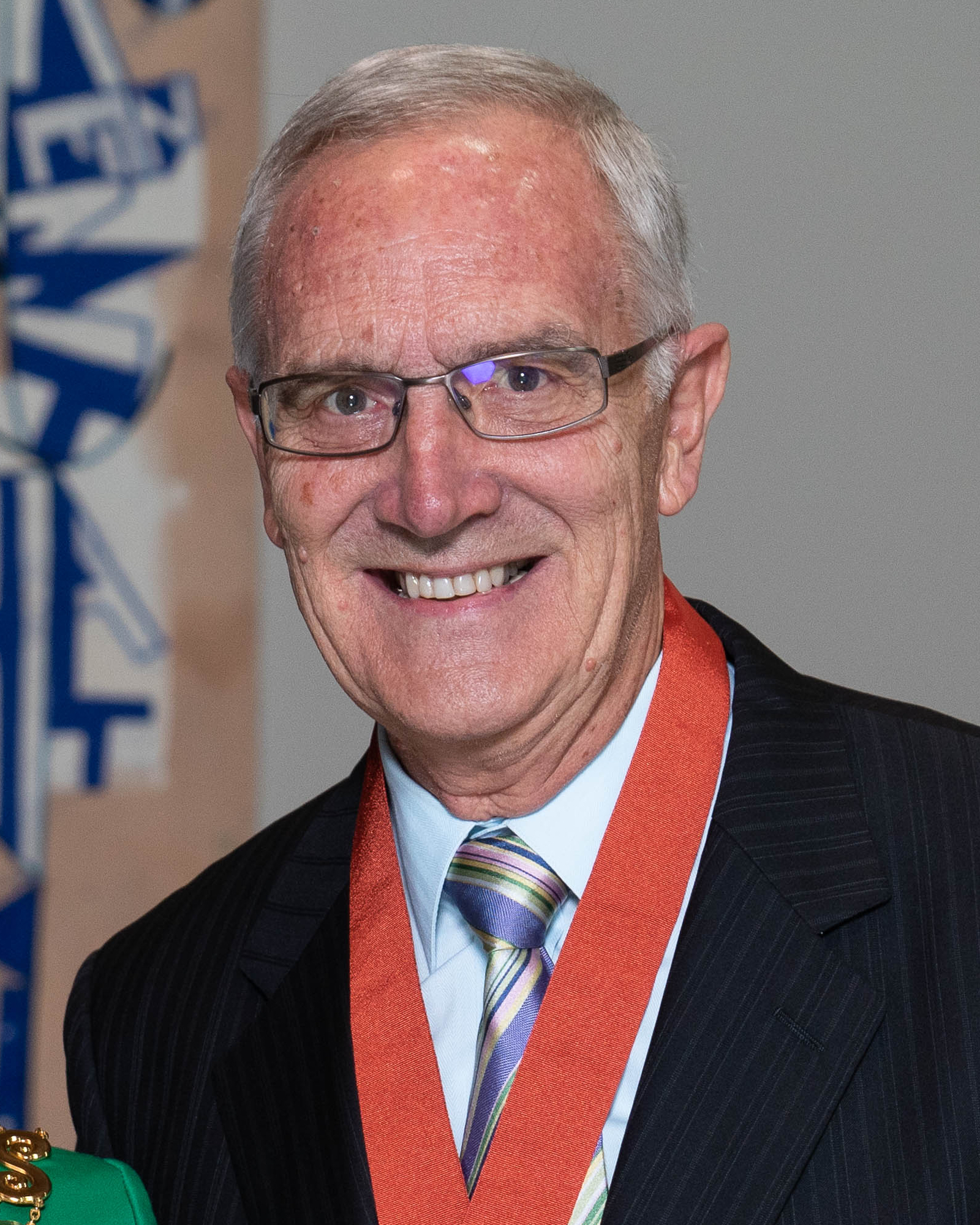
Lyn Stevens

=== Officer (ONZM) ===
- Denis William Aitken JP – of Outram. For services to the dairy industry and the community.
- Afamasaga Vaafusuaga Telesia McDonald Alipia – of Swanson. For services to Pacific early childhood education.
- Lisa Joy Allpress – of Whanganui. For services to the racing industry.
- Allan Ward Beck QSM – of Eltham. For services to agricultural aviation and aviation safety.
- Donovan Paul Bixley – of Taupō. For services to children's fiction and as an illustrator.
- Professor Jonathan George Boston – of Mount Cook, Wellington. For services to public and social policy.
- Alistair Grant Davis – of Palmerston North. For services to the motor industry, business and sustainability.
- Leo Michael Donnelly – of Mount Albert. For services to karate.
- Peter Dennis Elliott – of Westmere. For services to the performing arts and baseball.
- Professor Angela Rosina Farrow – of Wadestown. For services to the arts, particularly theatre.
- Dr Christine Margaret Foley – of Mount Eden. For services to victims of sexual assault.
- Dr Janette Fay Irvine – of Rotorua. For services to women and women's health.
- Murray Campbell Lynch – of Te Aro. For services to theatre.
- Dr Timothy Michael Malloy – of Warkworth. For services to health.
- Dr Colin Douglas Meurk – of Cashmere. For services to ecological restoration.
- The Right Reverend Te Kitohi Wiremu Pikaahu – of Paihia. For services to the Anglican Church and Māori.
- Brenda Pilott – of Johnsonville. For services to social and public service sectors.
- Superintendent John Richard Price OStJ – of Redcliffs. For services to the New Zealand Police and the community.
- Joanna Ruth Randerson – of Brooklyn. For services to the performing arts.
- Dr Geoffrey Wayne Rice – of Strowan. For services to historical research and tertiary education.
- Victor John Rodger – of Oriental Bay. For services to theatre and Pacific arts.
- Guy Winston Salmon – of Nelson. For services to the environment.
- Burton Ross Shipley – of Russell. For services to basketball.
- Roger Wilson Steele – of Paraparaumu. For services to the publishing industry and the arts.
- Dr Gail Tewaru Tipa – of East Taieri. For services to Māori and environmental management.
- Adjunct Associate Professor James Alan Tully – of Karori. For services to journalism and education.
- Colleen Mary Upton – of Trentham. For services to the plumbing and gasfitting industry and women.
- William Raymond Wallace JP – of Wainuiomata. For services to local government and the community.
- Chloe Angela Carol Wright – of Ōmokoroa. For services to philanthropy, education and health.
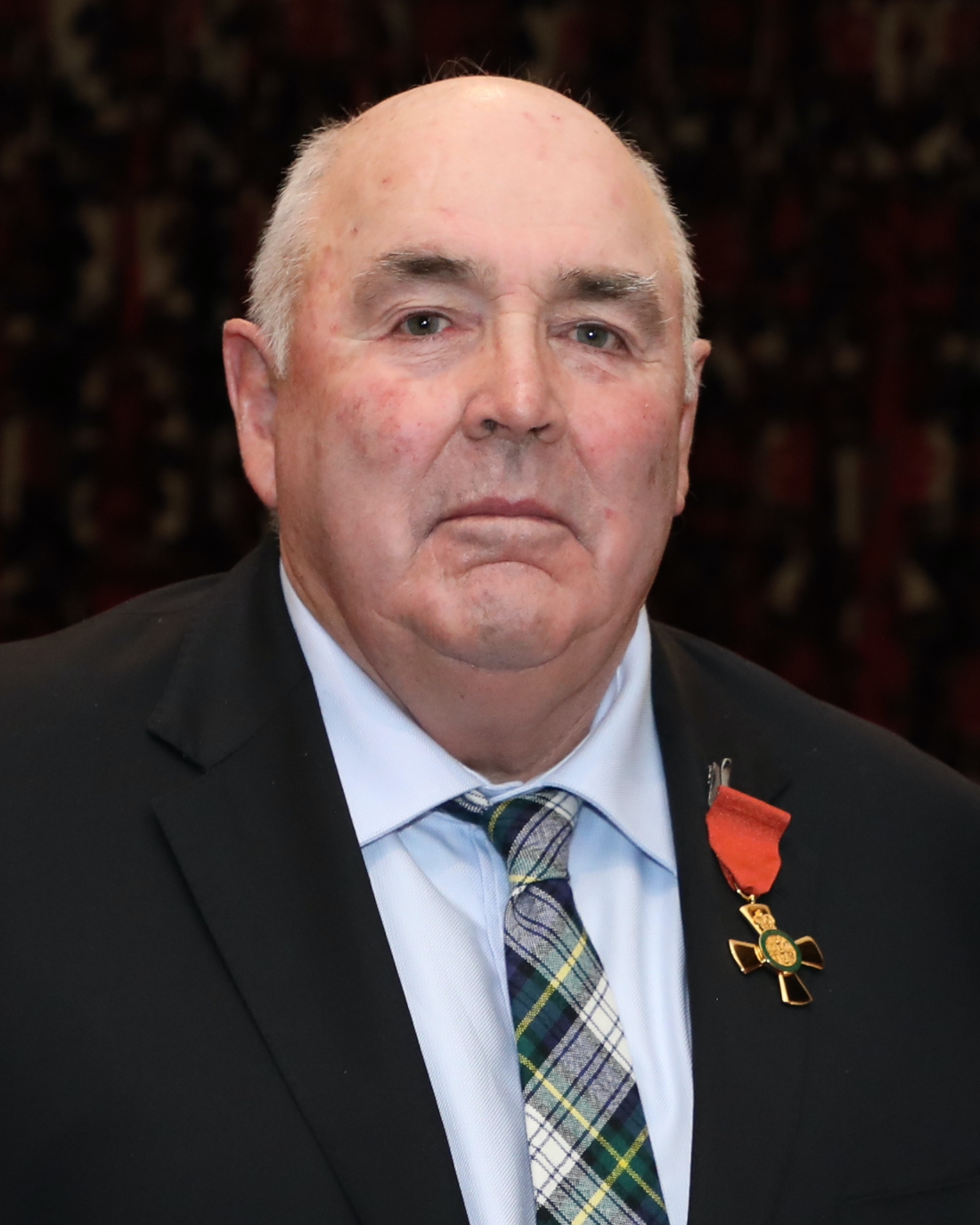
Denis Aitken

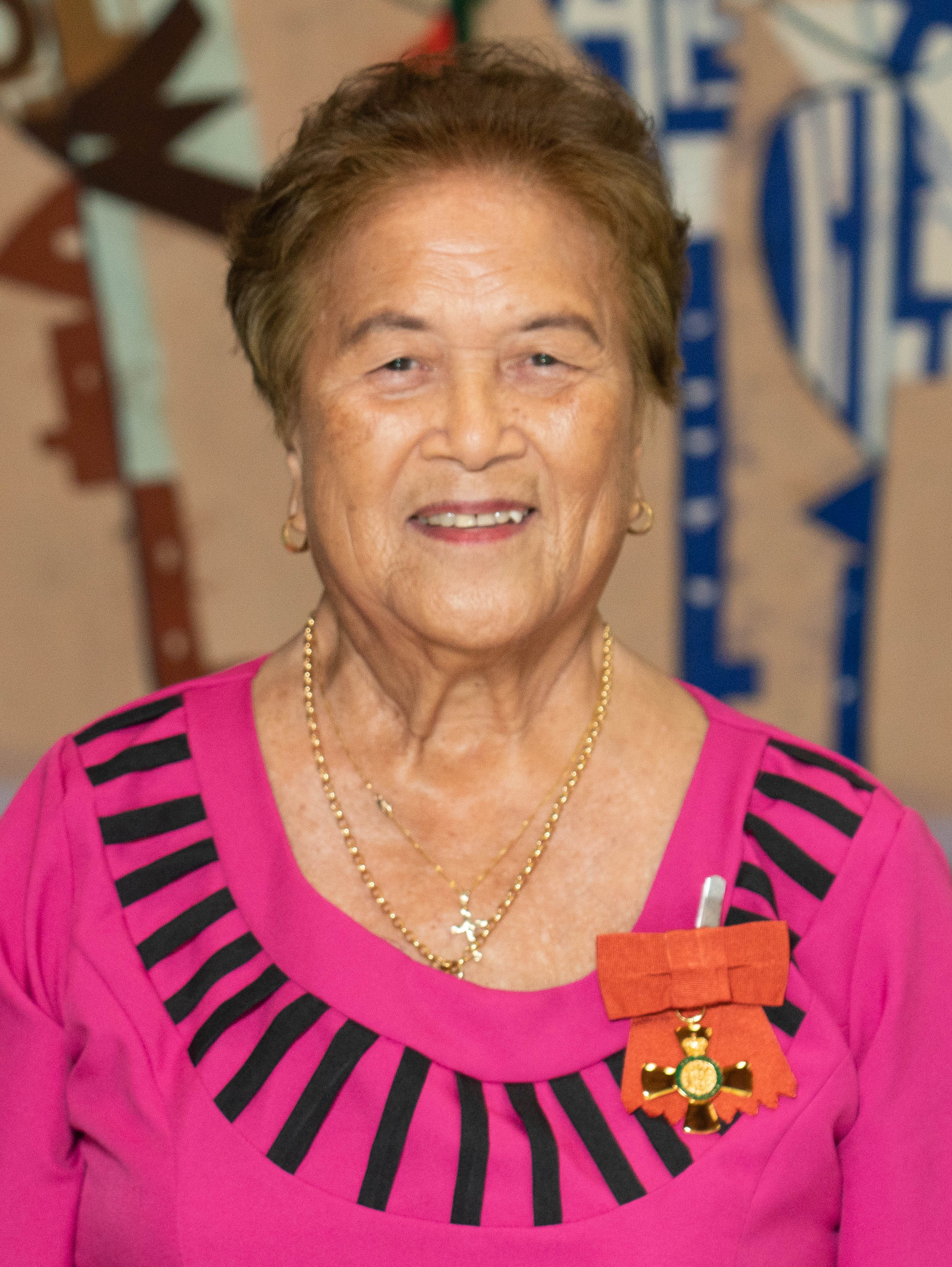
Telesia Alipia

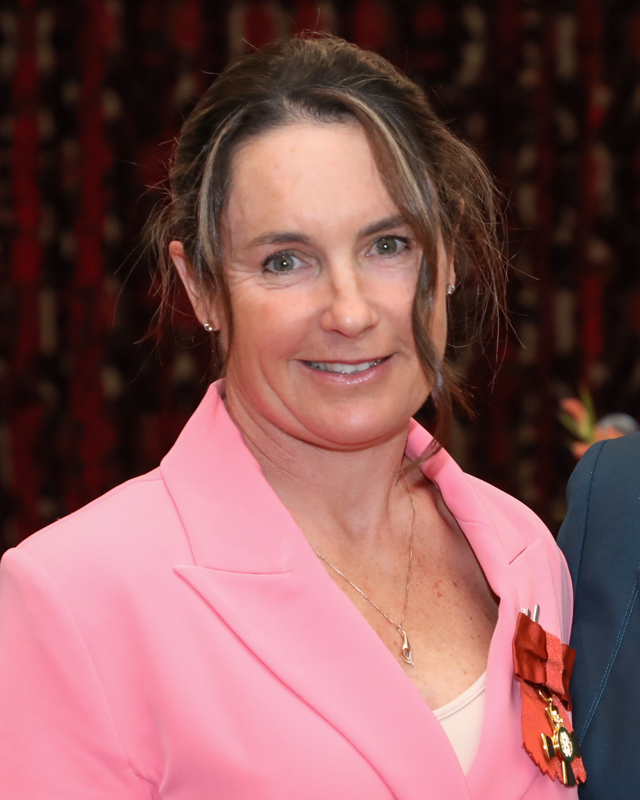
Lisa Allpress

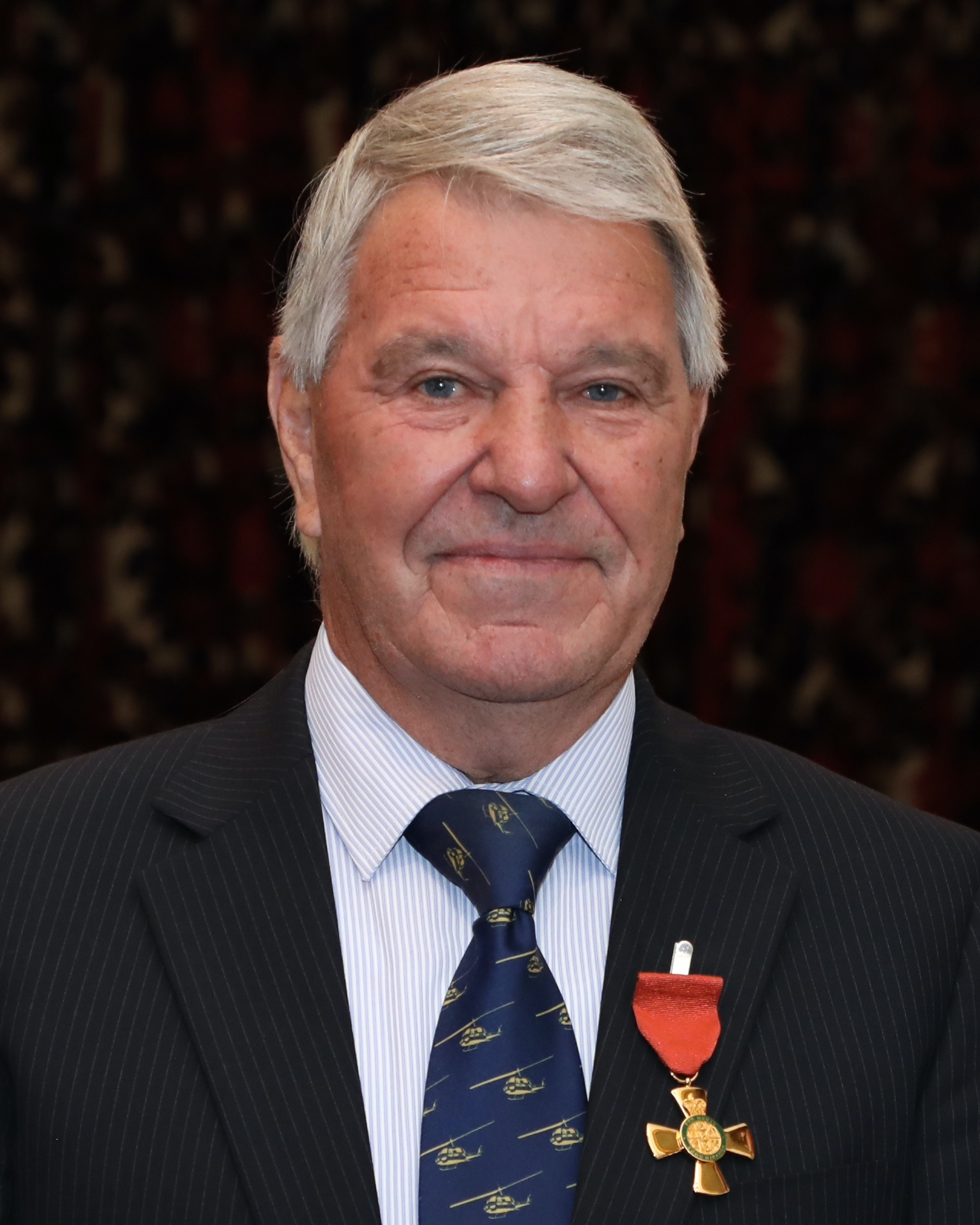
Allan Beck

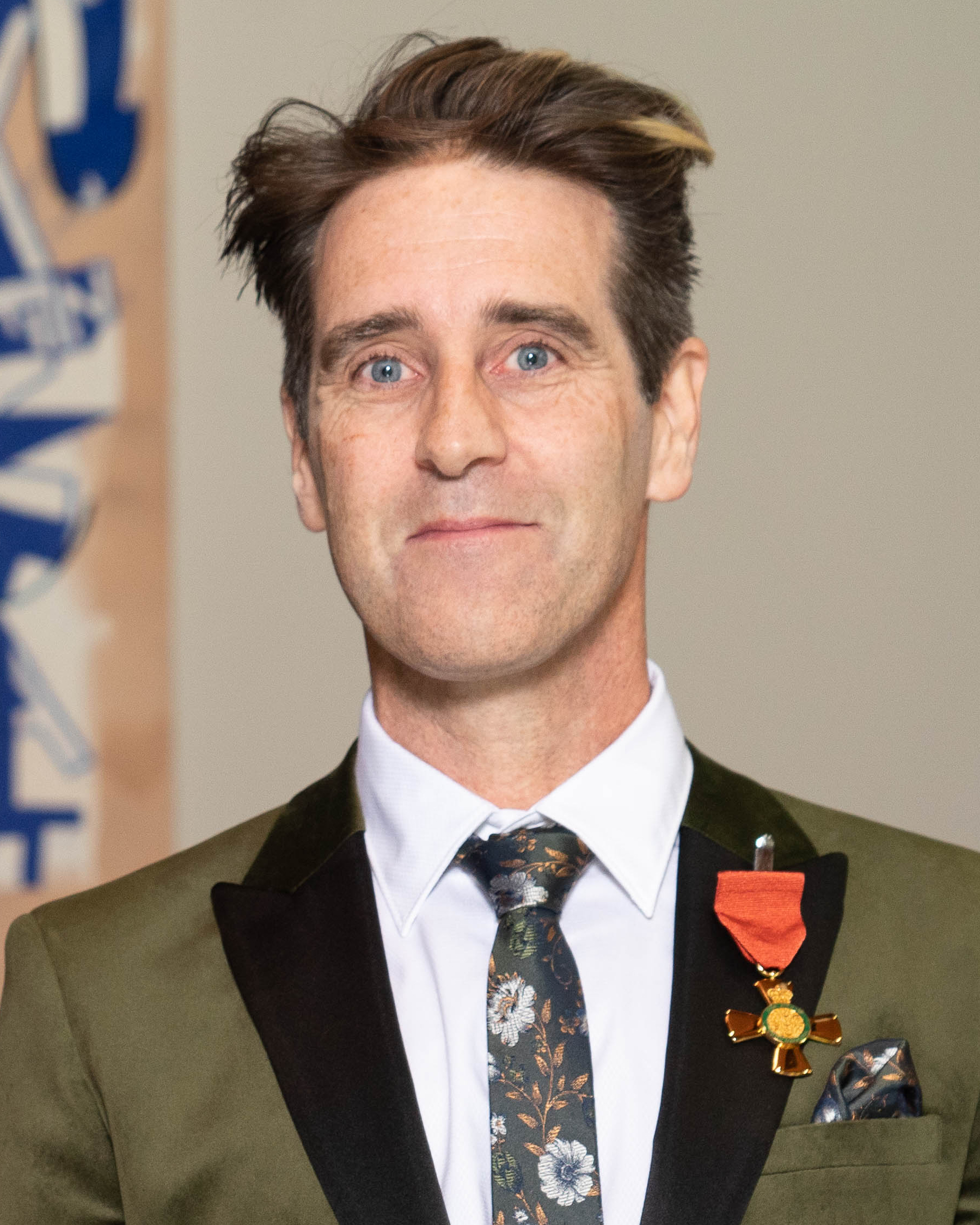
Donovan Bixley

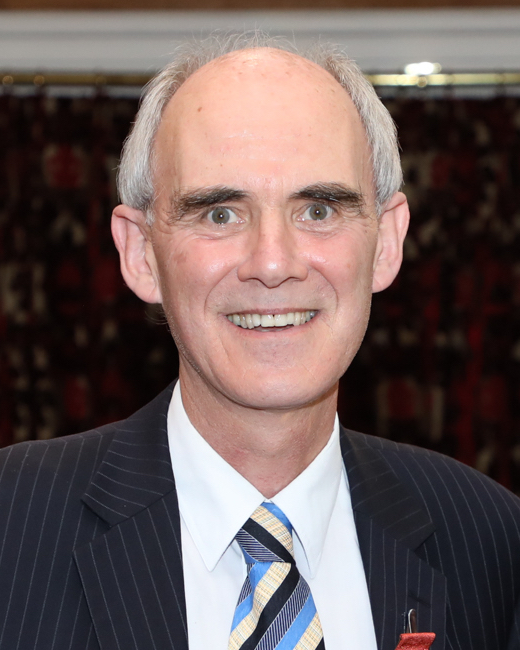
Jonathan Boston

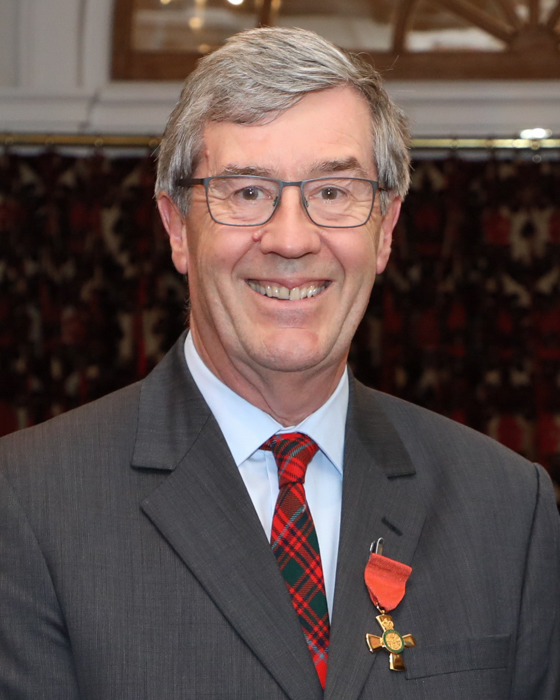
Alistair Davis

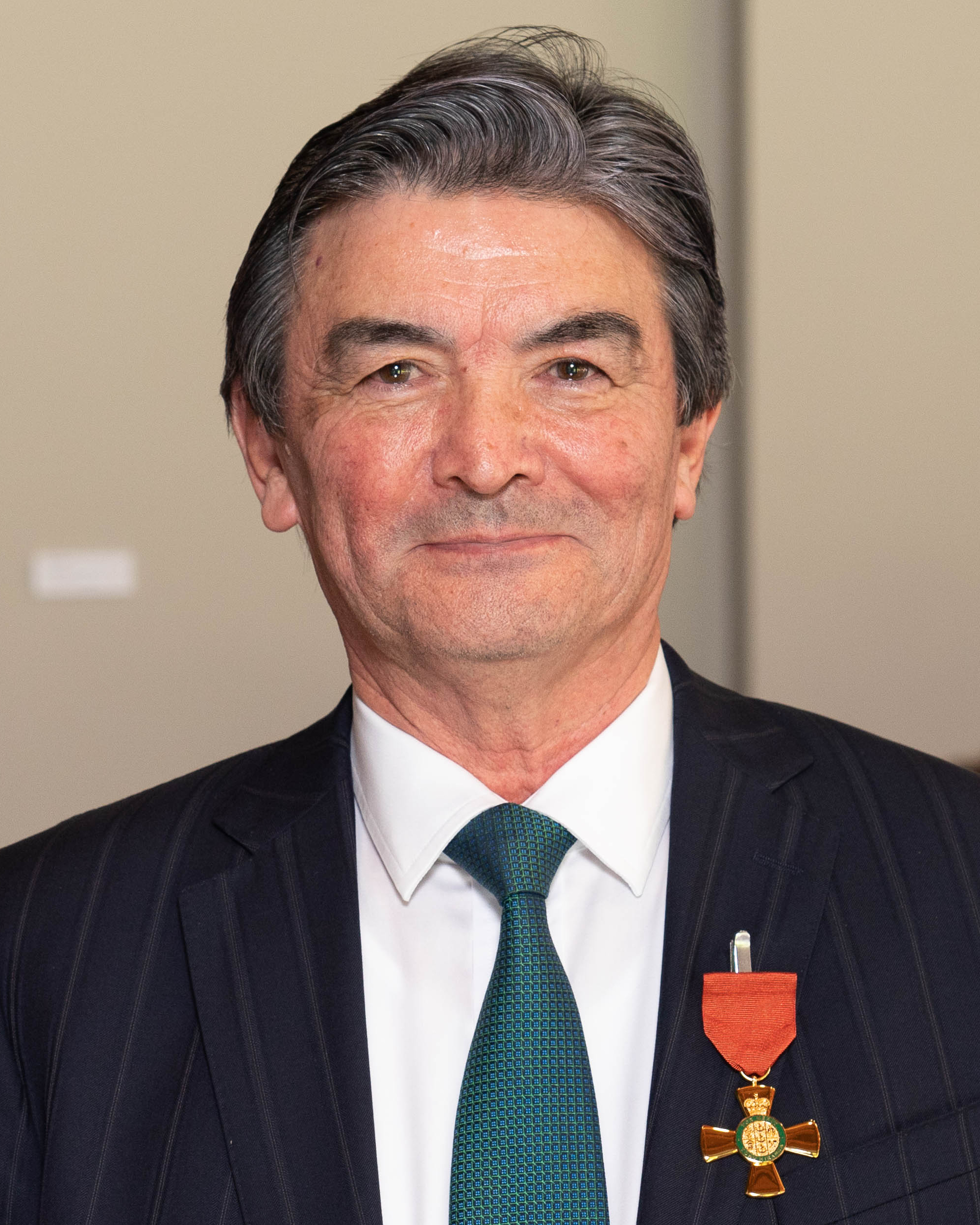
Leo Donnelly

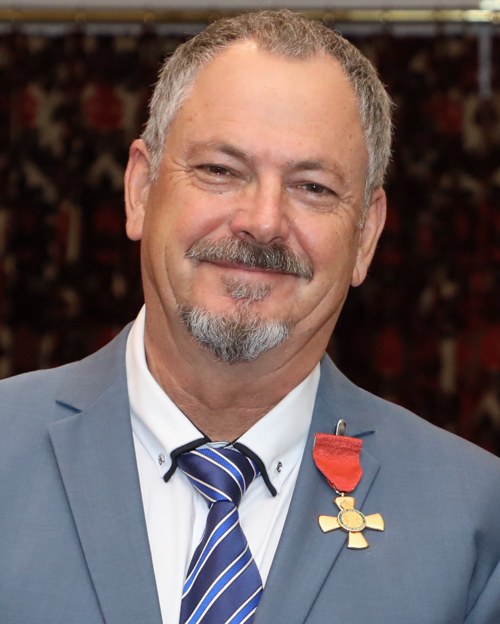
Peter Elliott

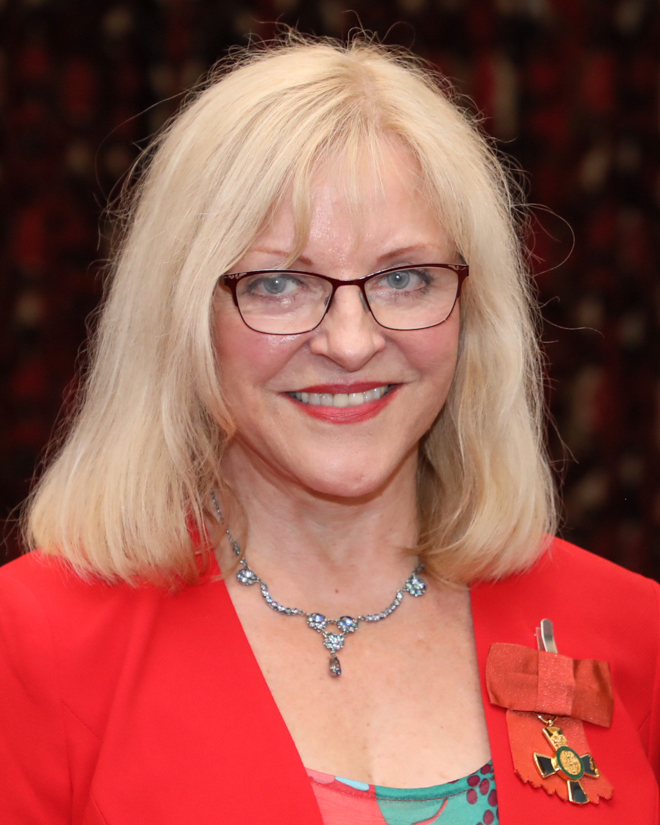
Angie Farrow

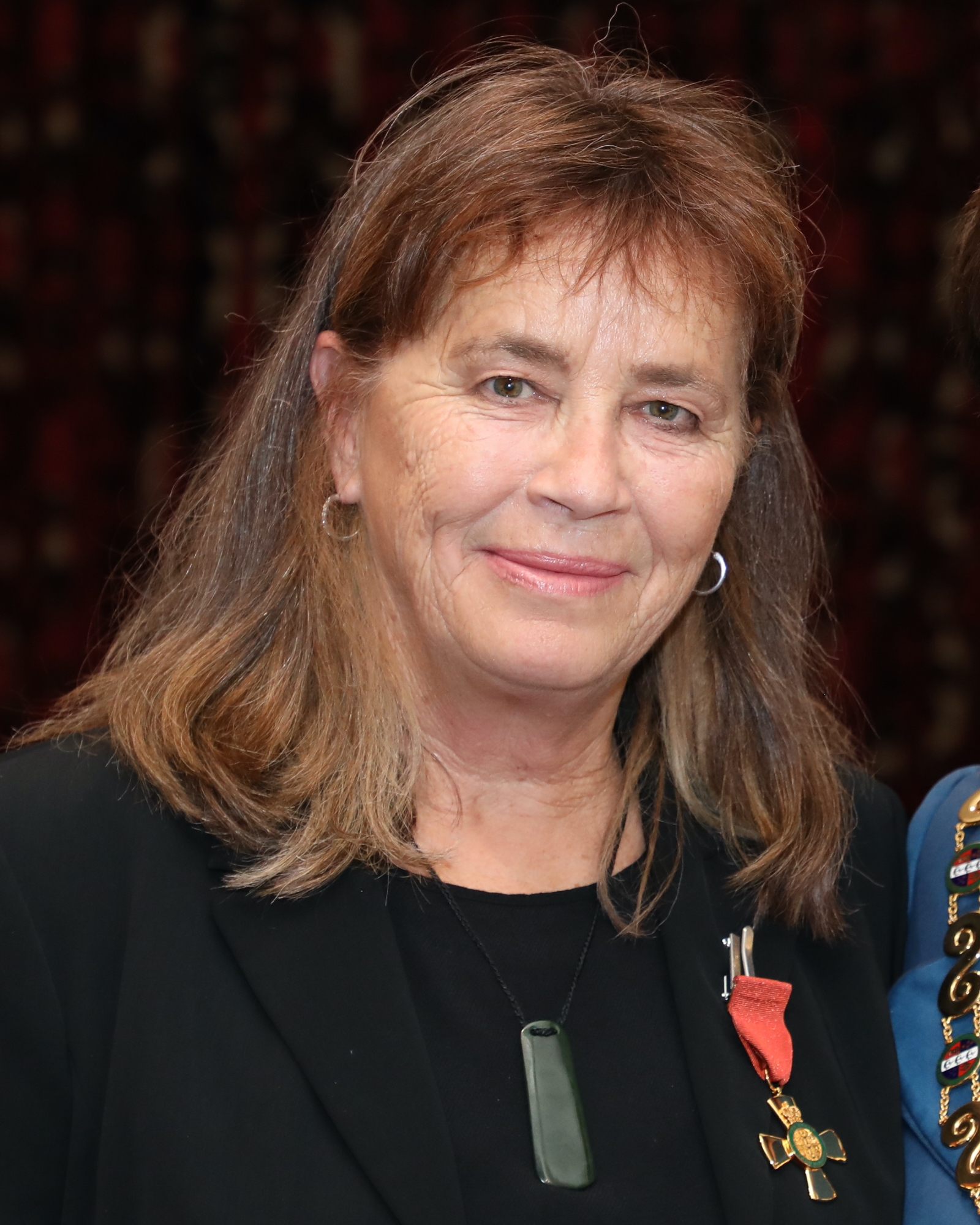
Christine Foley

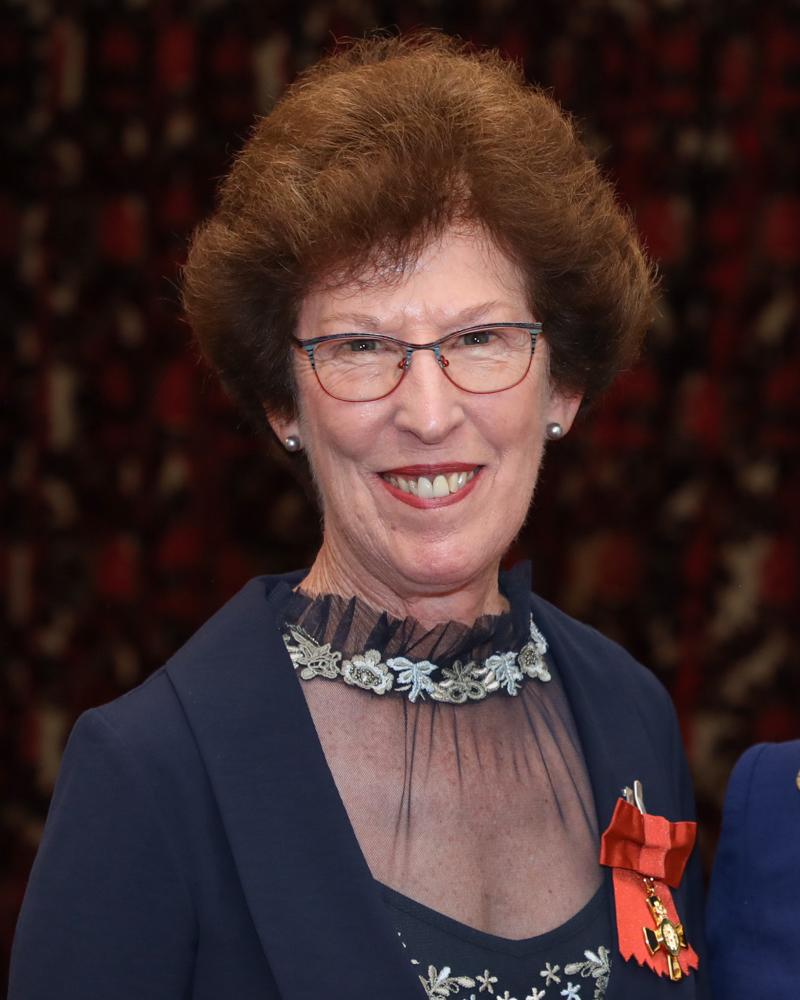
Janette Irvine

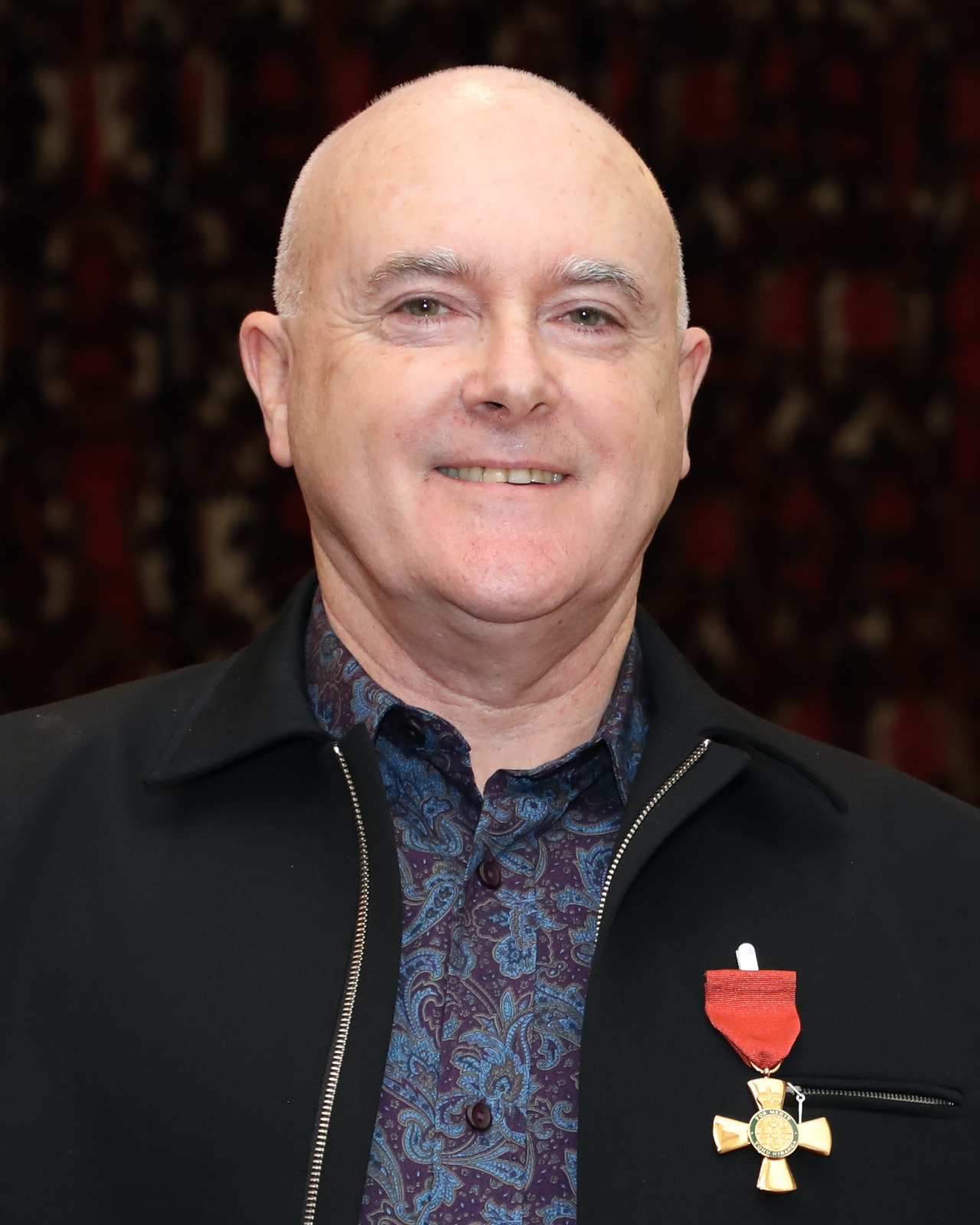
Murray Lynch

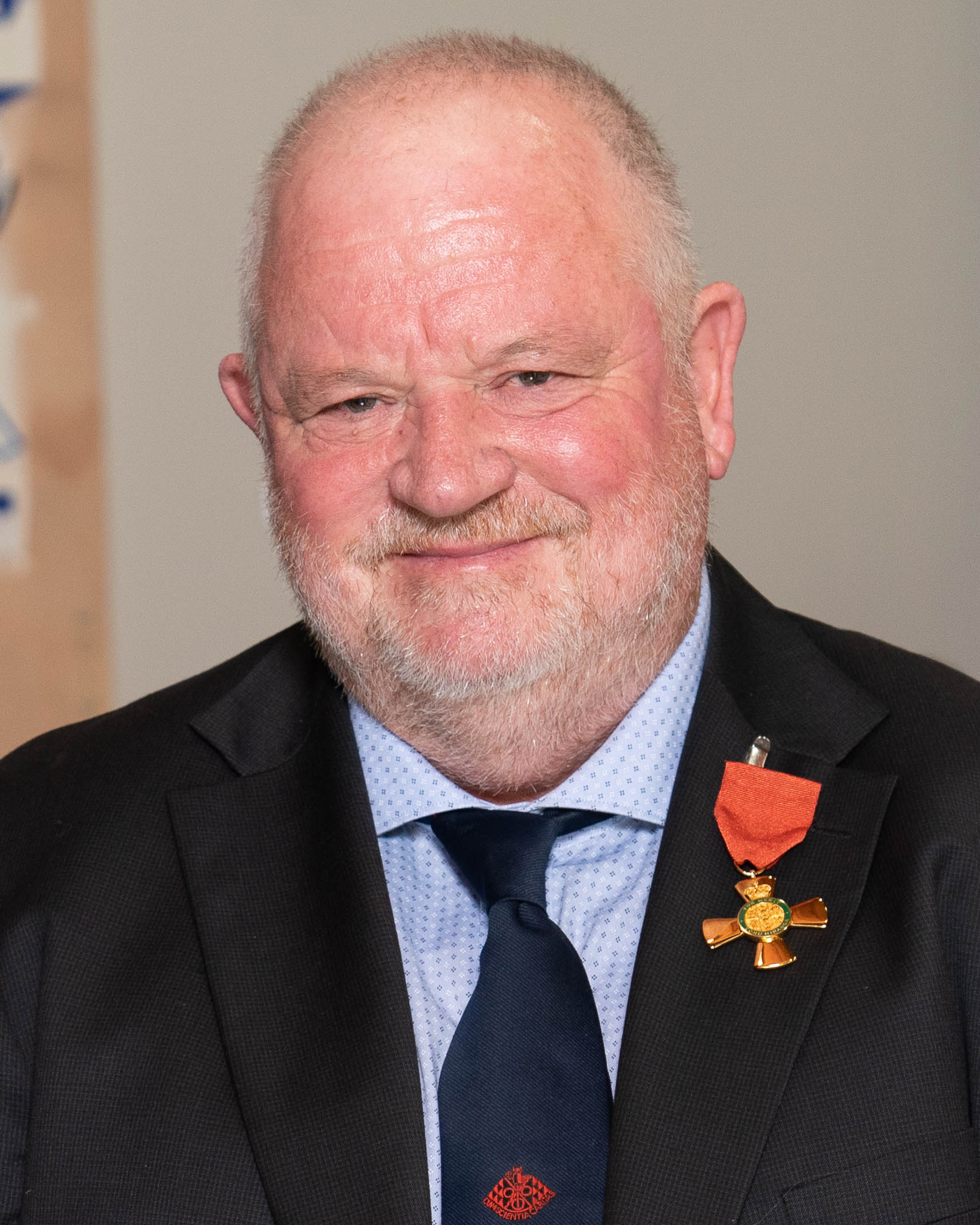
Tim Malloy

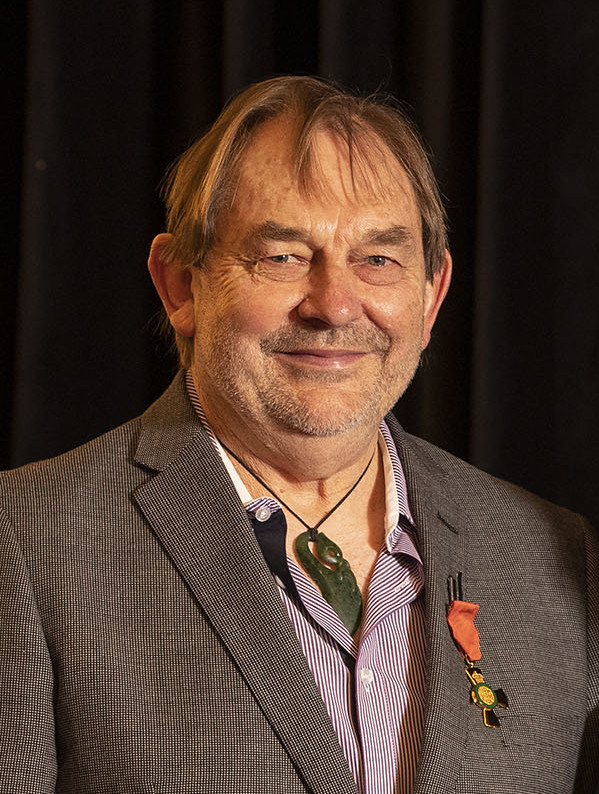
Colin Meurk

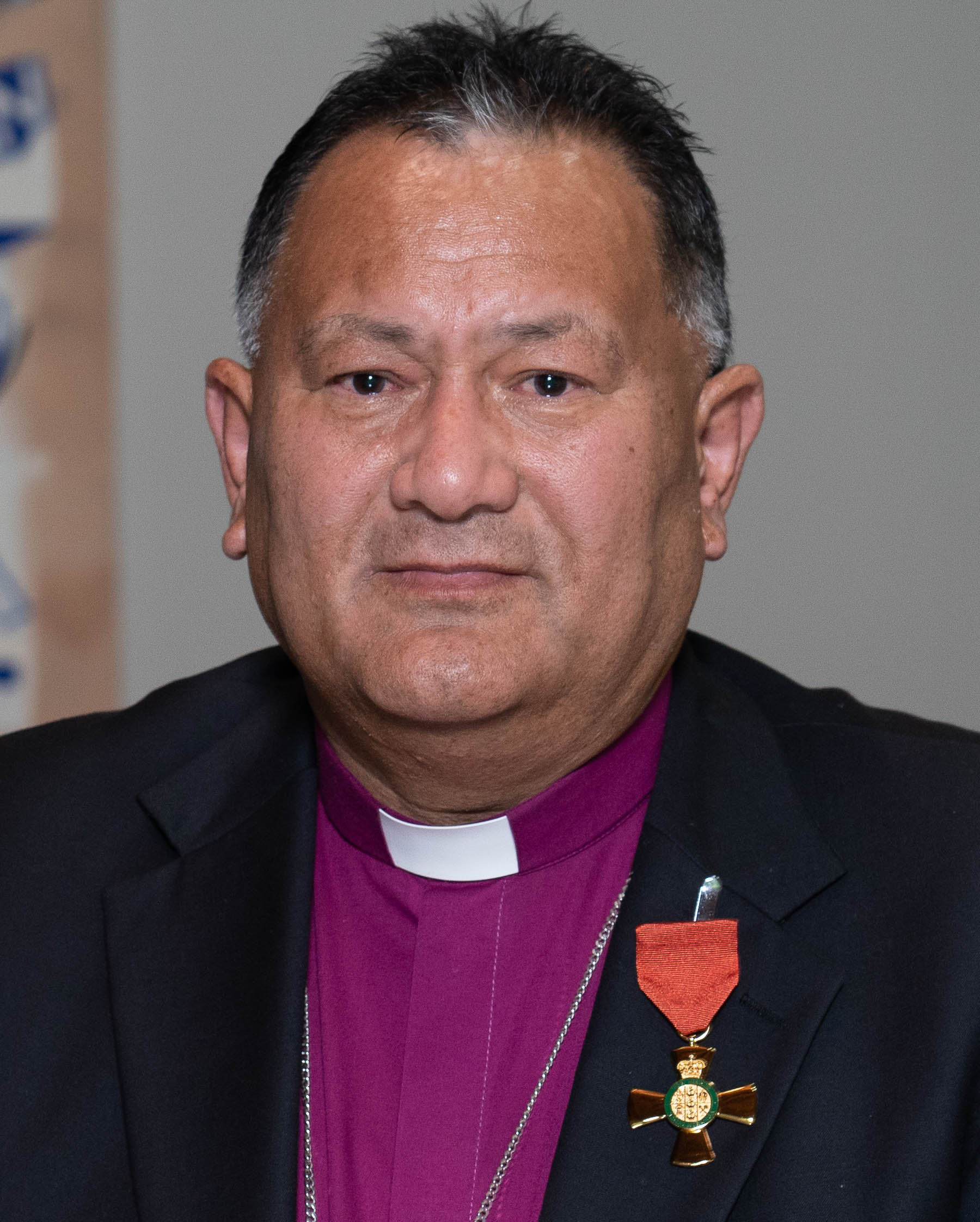
Kito Pikaahu

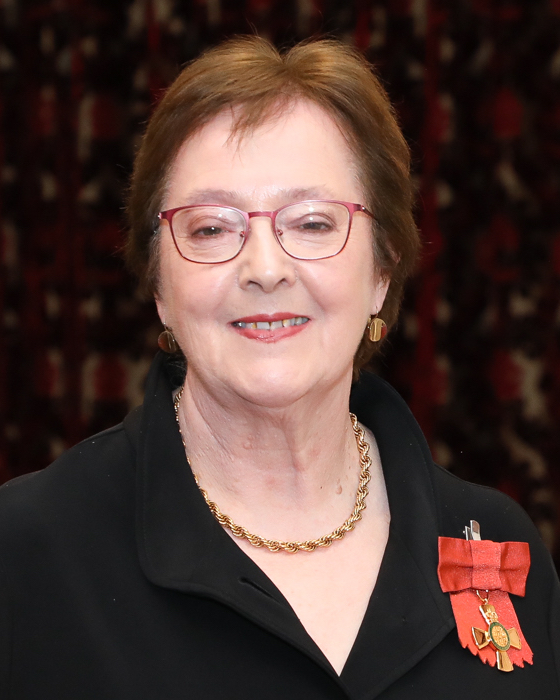
Brenda Pilott

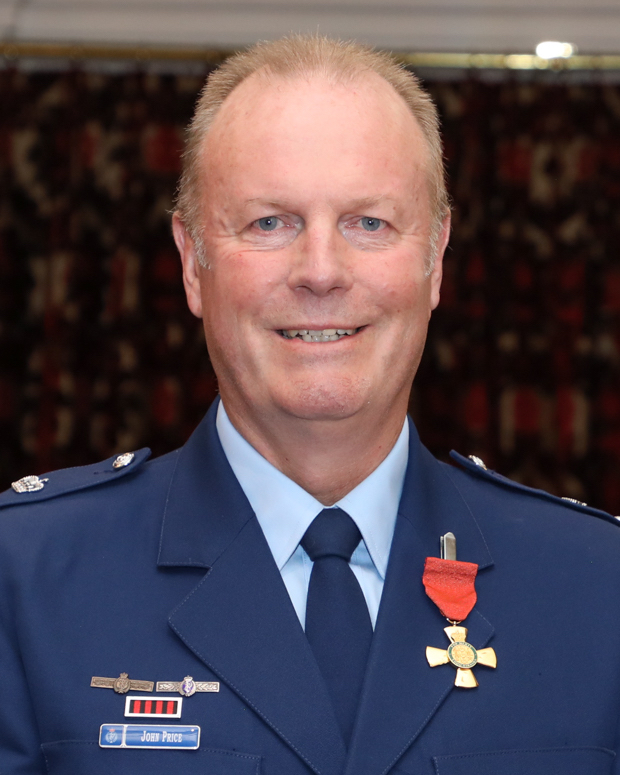
John Price

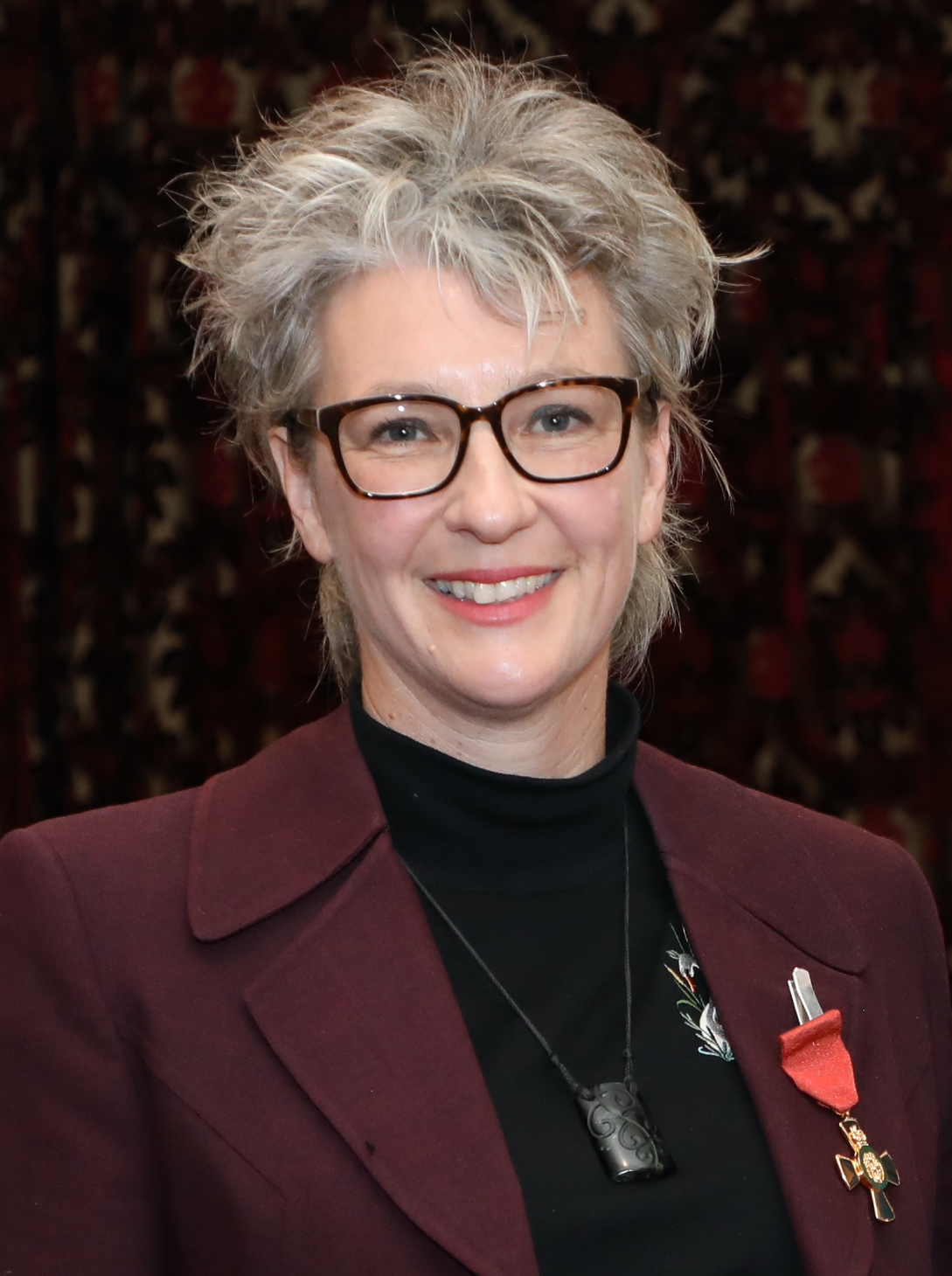
Jo Randerson

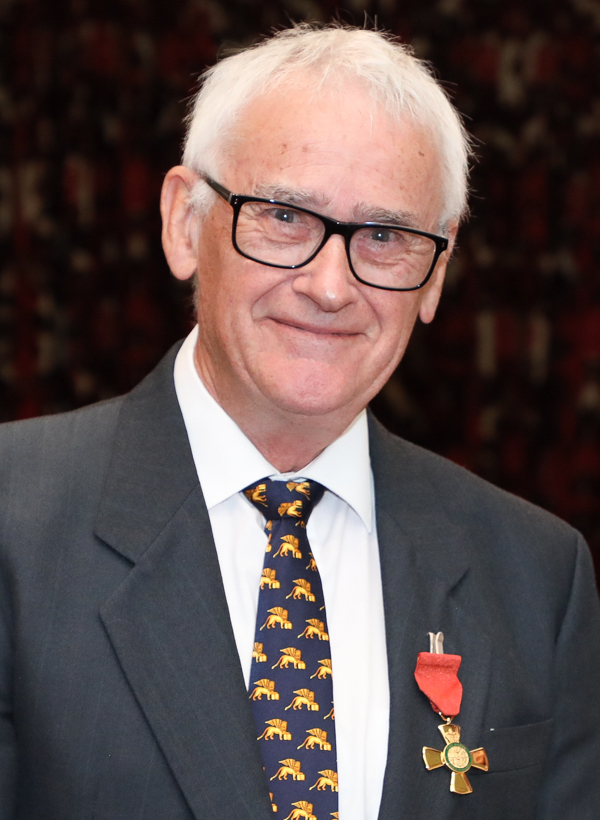
Geoffrey Rice

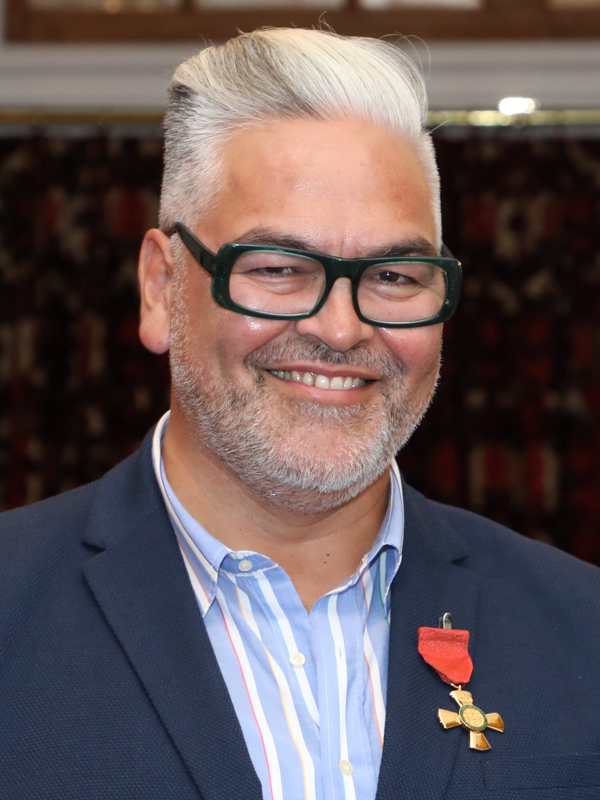
Victor Rodger

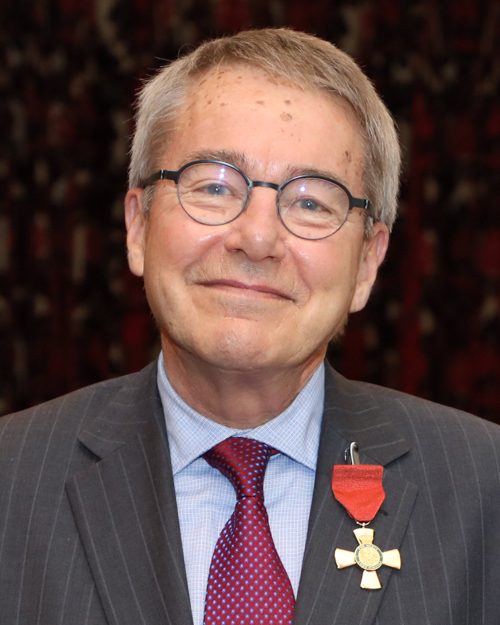
Guy Salmon

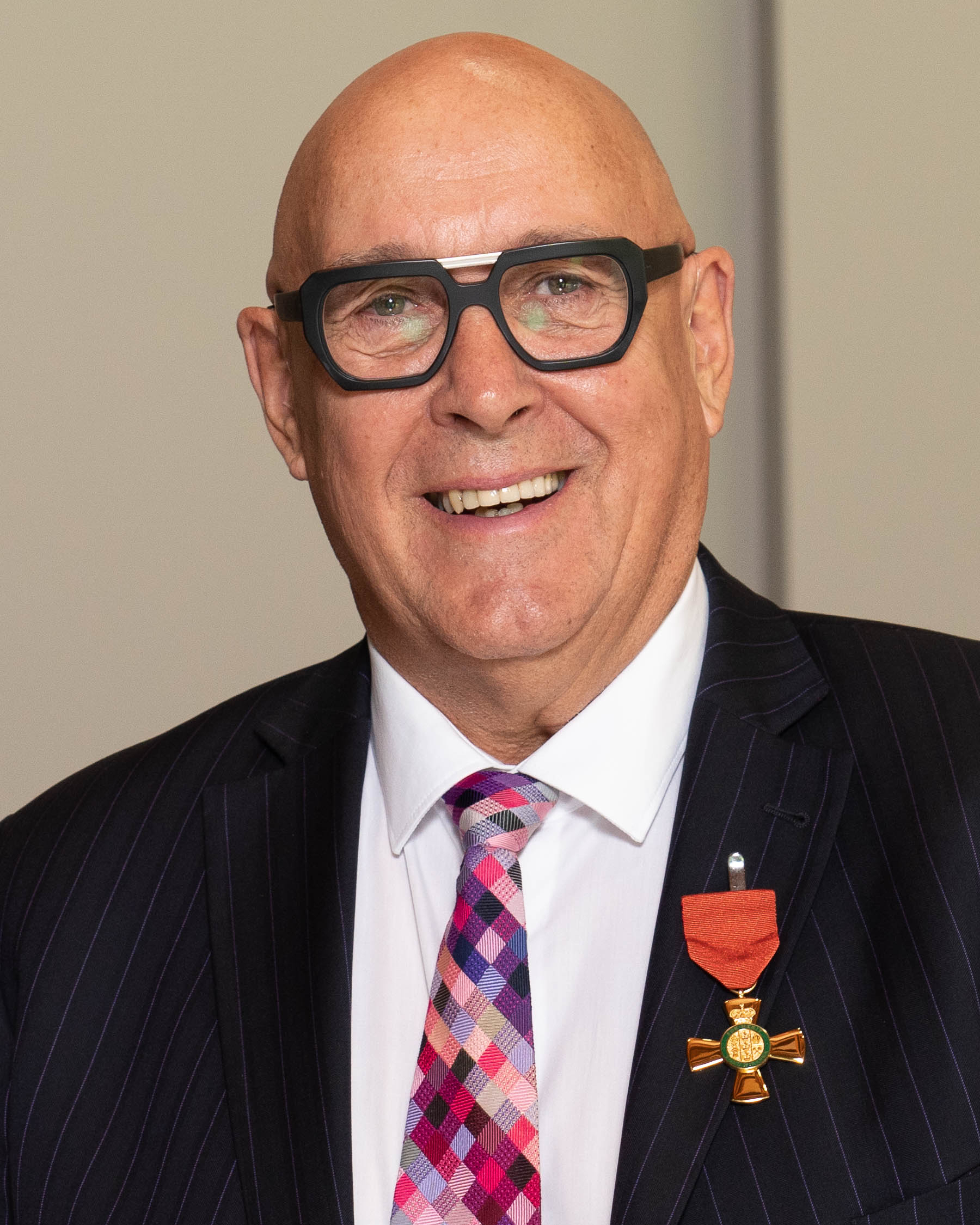
Burton Shipley

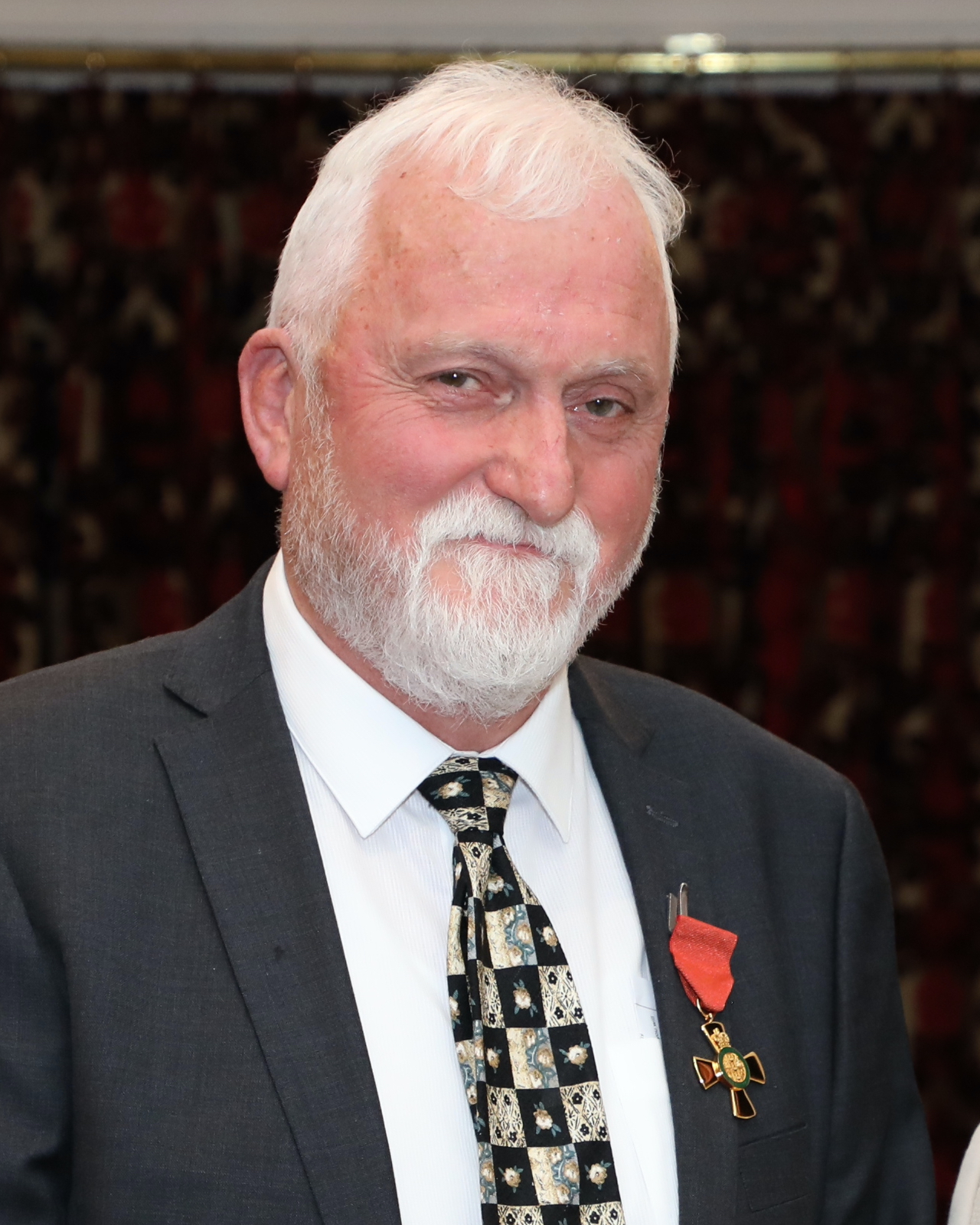
Roger Steele

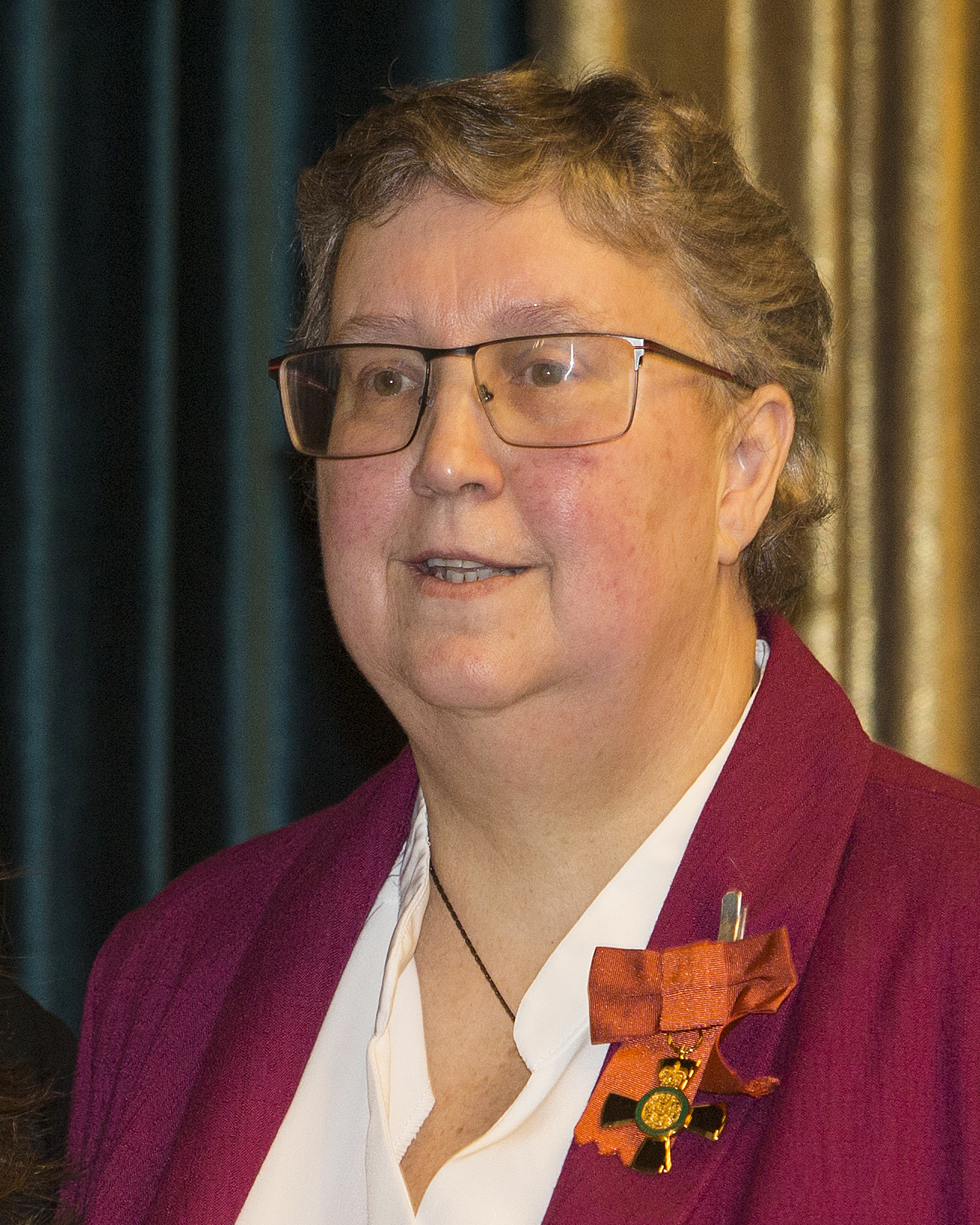
Gail Tipa

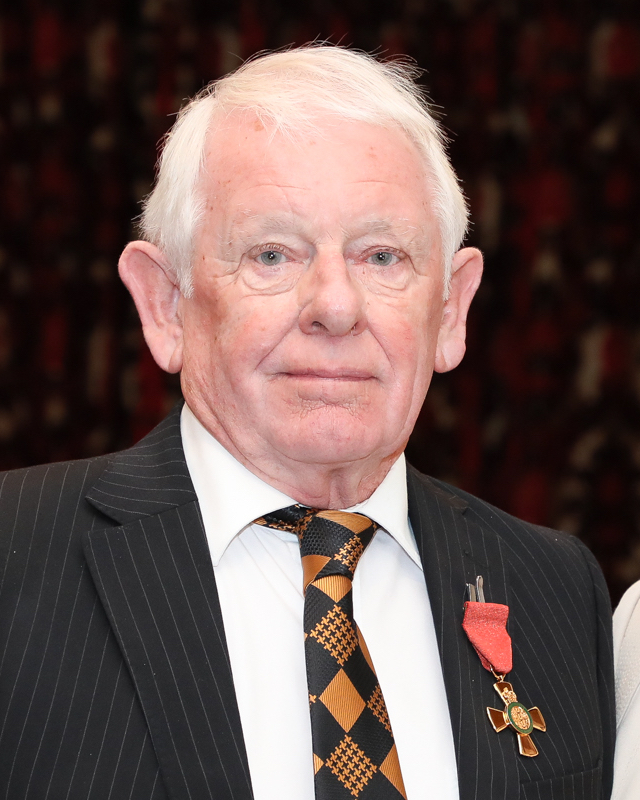
Jim Tully

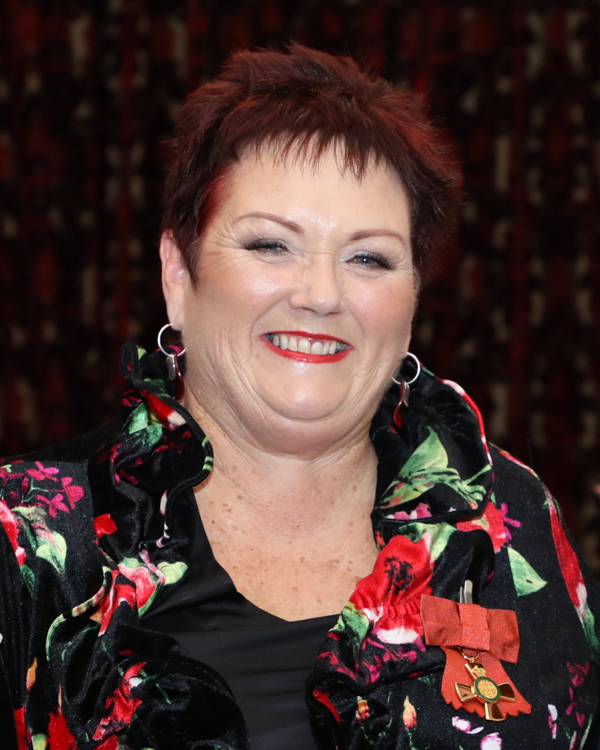
Colleen Upton

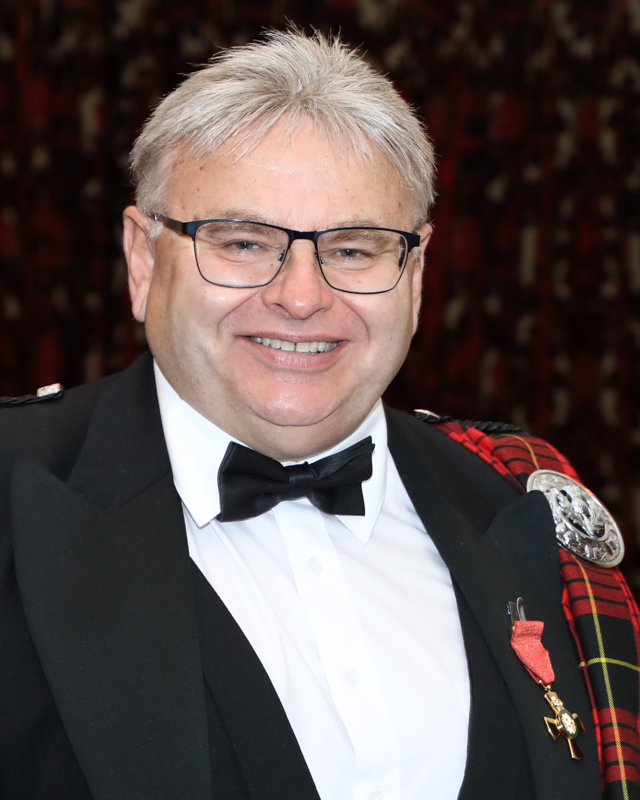
Ray Wallace

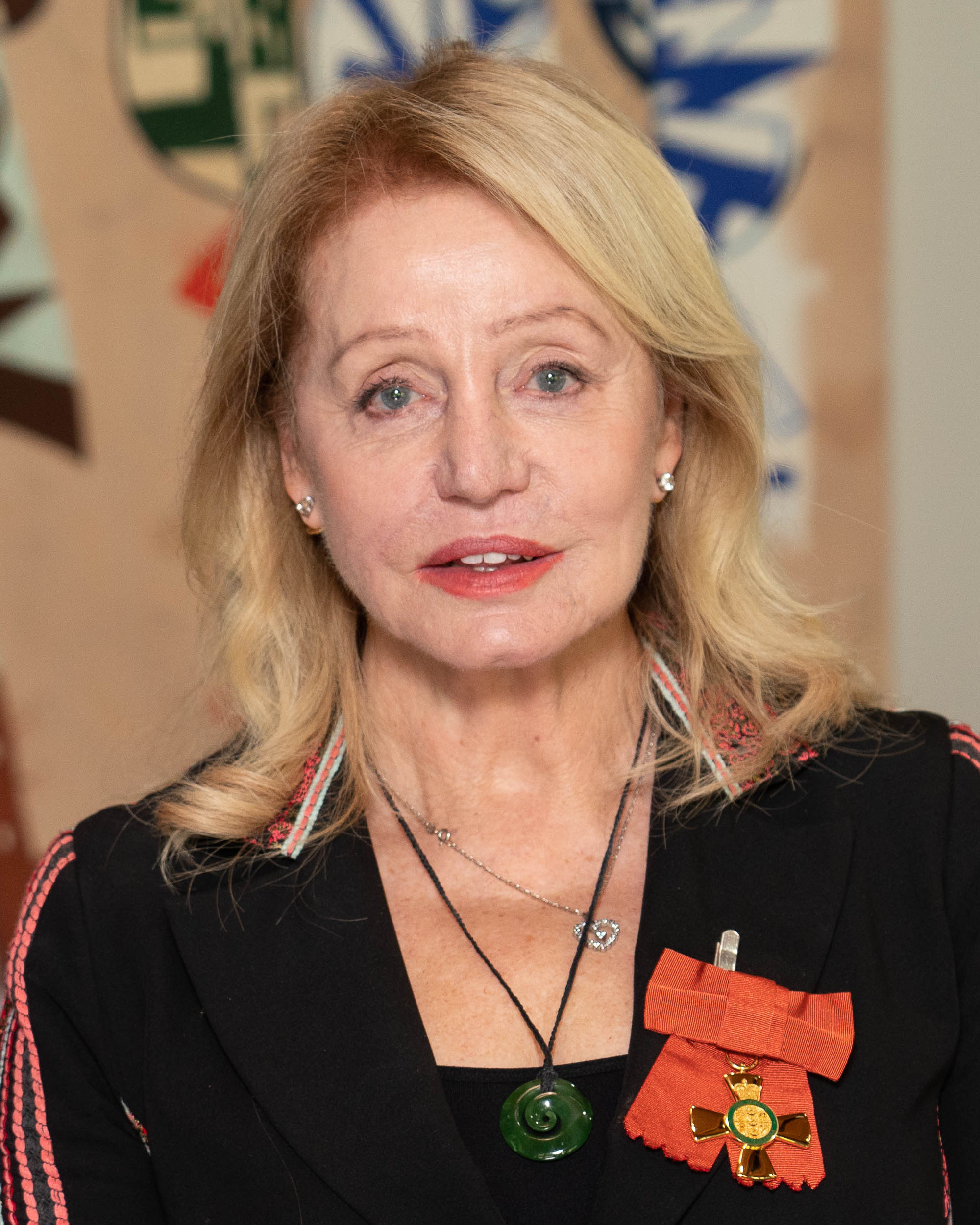
Chloe Wright

=== Member (MNZM) ===
- Inspector Tamuera Aitama Aberahama – of Outer Kaiti. For services to the New Zealand Police and the community.
- Susan Veronica Anderson JP – of Whanganui. For services to restorative justice.
- Dr Lisa Shelley Argilla – of Liberton. For services to animal welfare and conservation.
- Professor Michael George Baker – of Brooklyn. For services to public health science.
- Janet Elsie Barnes JP – of Mount Maunganui. For services to local government and the community.
- Christina Joy Barton – of Northland. For services to art history and curation.
- Major David Thomas Bennett – of Kelson. For services to the Salvation Army and the community.
- Mark Alexander Bowden – of Ōakura. For services to education.
- Sheena Cameron – of Green Bay. For services to education.
- Kendra Margaret Cocksedge – of Spreydon. For services to rugby.
- Michelle Anne Crook – of Cambridge. For services to the community.
- Vanisa Dhiru JP – of Thorndon. For services to the community and gender rights.
- Edward John Edwards – of Māngere. For services to sustainable business and harness racing.
- Kenneth John Forrest – of Blenheim. For services to the electricity industry and business.
- Prudence Anne Gooch – of Bethlehem. For services to dance.
- Dr SallyAnn Harbison – of Green Bay. For services to forensic science.
- Professor Bronwyn Mary Hayward – of St Albans. For services to political science, particularly sustainability, climate change and youth.
- Vicki Anne Heikell – of Porirua. For services to heritage preservation and Māori.
- Professor Shaun Cameron Hendy – of Grey Lynn. For services to science.
- Michele Rae Hine – of Grey Lynn. For services to performing arts education.
- Keith Luke Ingram JP – of Half Moon Bay, Auckland. For services to the fishing and maritime industry.
- Dickson Stewart Jardine – of Queenstown. For services to philanthropy and conservation.
- Jillian Frances Jardine – of Queenstown. For services to philanthropy and conservation.
- Helen Susan Johnson – of Milson. For services to the Special Olympics and the community.
- Rodney Whitiora Jones – of Herne Bay. For services to economics and public health research.
- Samuel Edwin Isaac Judd – of Birkenhead. For services to the environment and sustainability education.
- Dr Glenda Ruth Keam – of Titirangi. For services to music and music education.
- James Edward Kebbell – of Ōtaki. For services to sustainable business and the community.
- James Kelly – of Caversham. For services to the trade-union movement.
- Inspector Kieren William Kortegast – of Hillmorton. For services to the New Zealand Police and the community.
- Janet Lyn Lane – of Kelburn. For services to tertiary education.
- Josephina Henrica Maria Lelijveld – of North East Valley. For services to the deaf community and education.
- Keith James Locke – of Mount Eden. For services to human rights advocacy.
- Donald William Mackenzie – of Fendalton. For services to athletics and the community.
- John McIntosh – of Hillcrest, Hamilton. For services to people with disabilities.
- Dr Jann Medlicott – of Mount Maunganui. For services to philanthropy, the arts and radiology.
- Melissa Potocka Moon – of Kelburn. For services to athletics and charitable causes.
- Christopher John Morrison – of Grey Lynn. For services to sustainable business and fair trade.
- Janice Mildred Murphy – of Burnside, Christchurch. For services to education and children with intellectual disabilities.
- Katie Murray QSM – of Kaitaia. For services to Māori and the community.
- Dr James Wayne Ngata – of Tolaga Bay. For services to Māori and education.
- Paul Gerard Norris – of Te Anau. For services to the tourism industry and conservation.
- Denise Alexandra Ritchie – of Auckland. For services to the prevention of sexual violence and exploitation.
- Muipu La'avasa Sagaga – of Whangaparāoa. For services to boxing.
- Serviceman M. For services to the New Zealand Defence Force.
- Dr Gagrath Pradeep Singh – of Freemans Bay. For services to health.
- Pauline Kei Smith – of Riverton. For services to Pacific arts and the community.
- Michael John Sutton – of Hamilton East. For services to education.
- Moana Ngawaiata Tamaariki-Pohe – of Ōrākei. For services to Māori and conservation.
- Dr Tasileta Teevale – of Andersons Bay. For services to Pacific education and public health research.
- William Trubridge – of Havelock North. For services to freediving.
- The Reverend Tumama Vili – of Woolston. For services to the Pacific community.
- Gary Lynnford Watts – of Northcote, Christchurch. For services to mental health.
- Marion Wood – of Ōtaki. For services to sustainable business and the community.

Honorary

- Professor Susan Pran Krumdieck – of Ilam. For services to sustainability research and engineering.
- Emeritus Professor Yoshihiro Sakata – of Kyoto, Japan. For services to New Zealand–Japan relations and rugby.
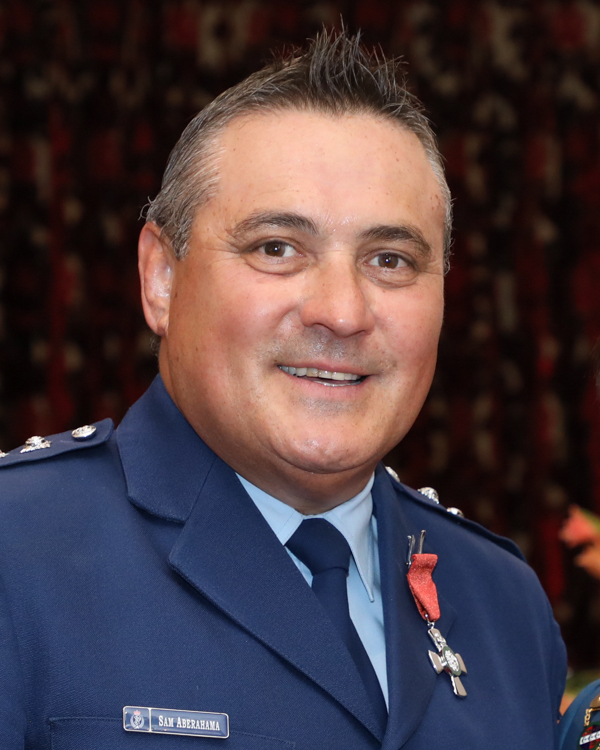
Sam Aberahama

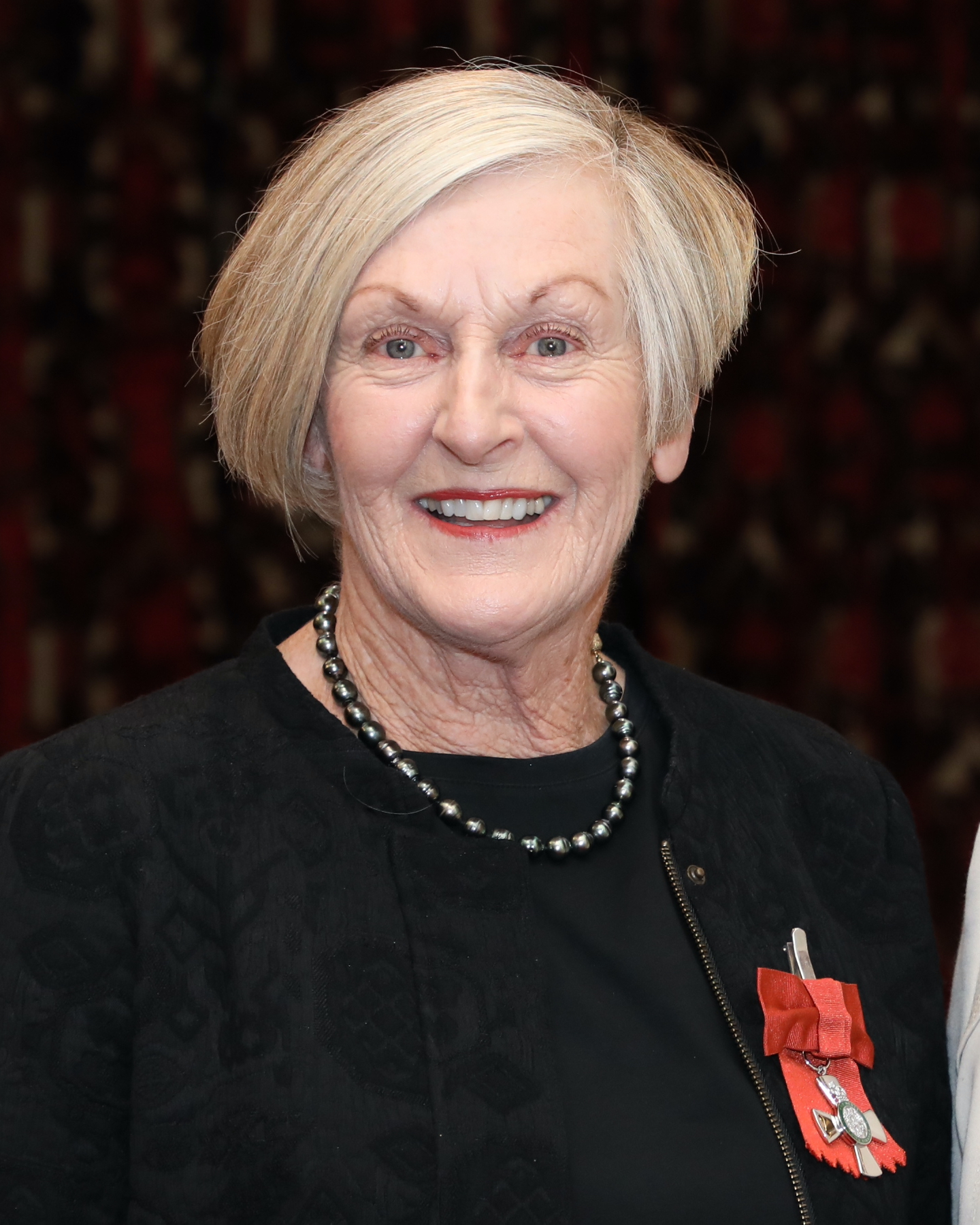
Susan Anderson

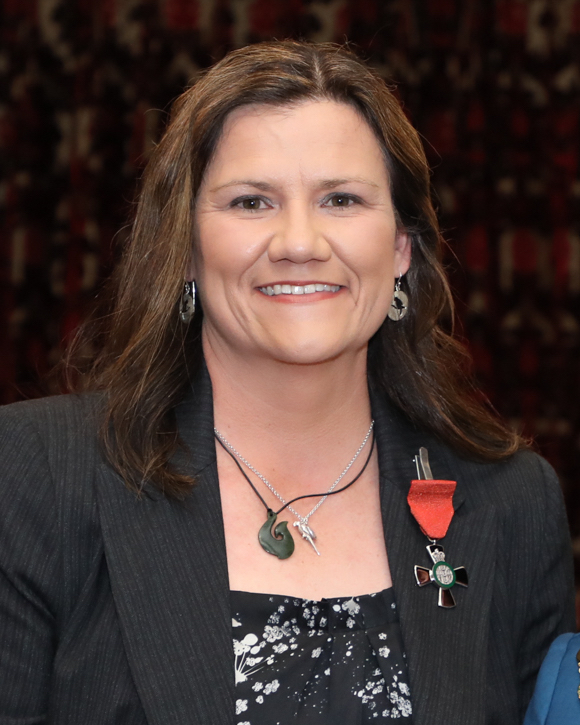
Lisa Argilla

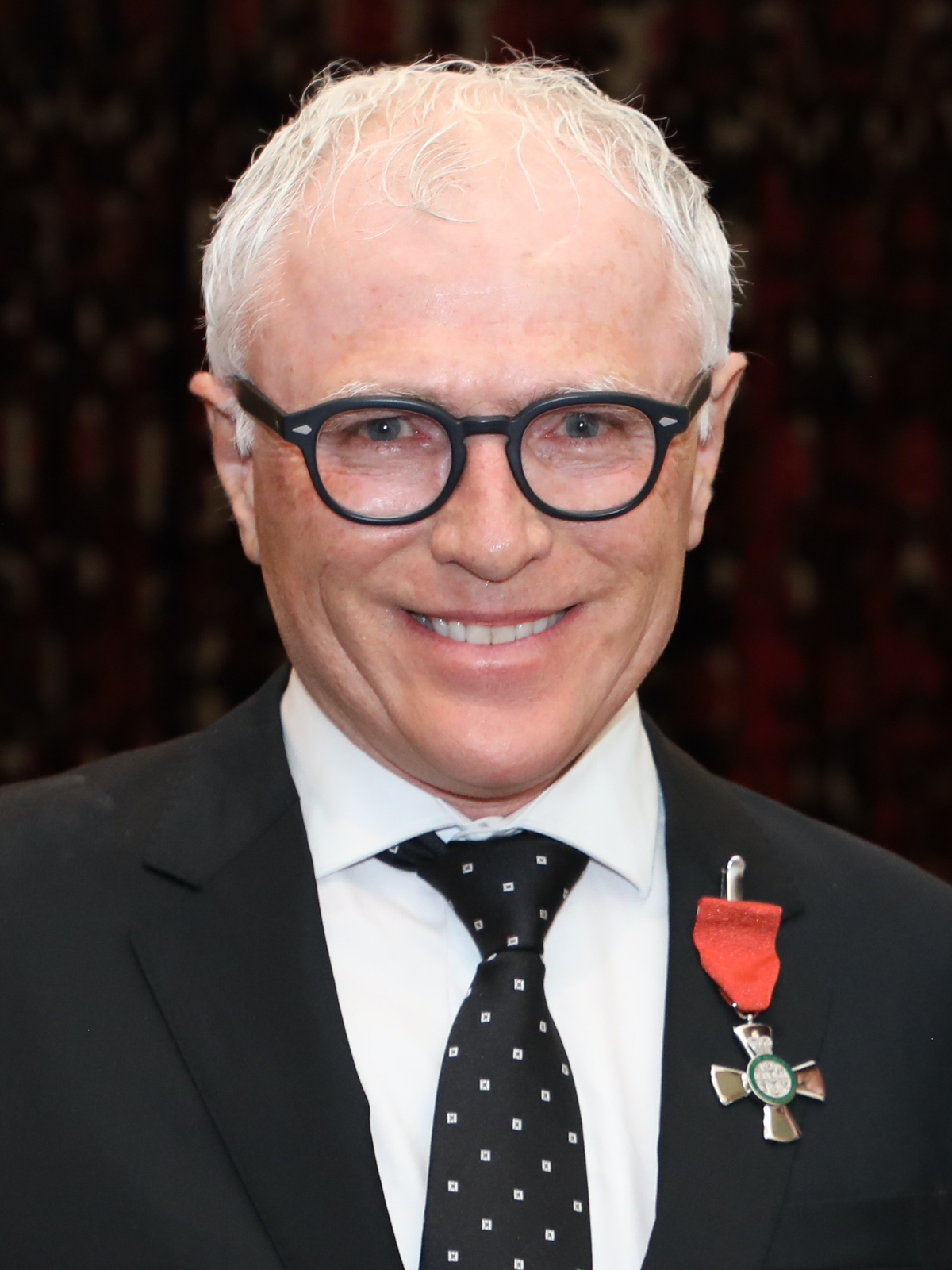
Michael Baker

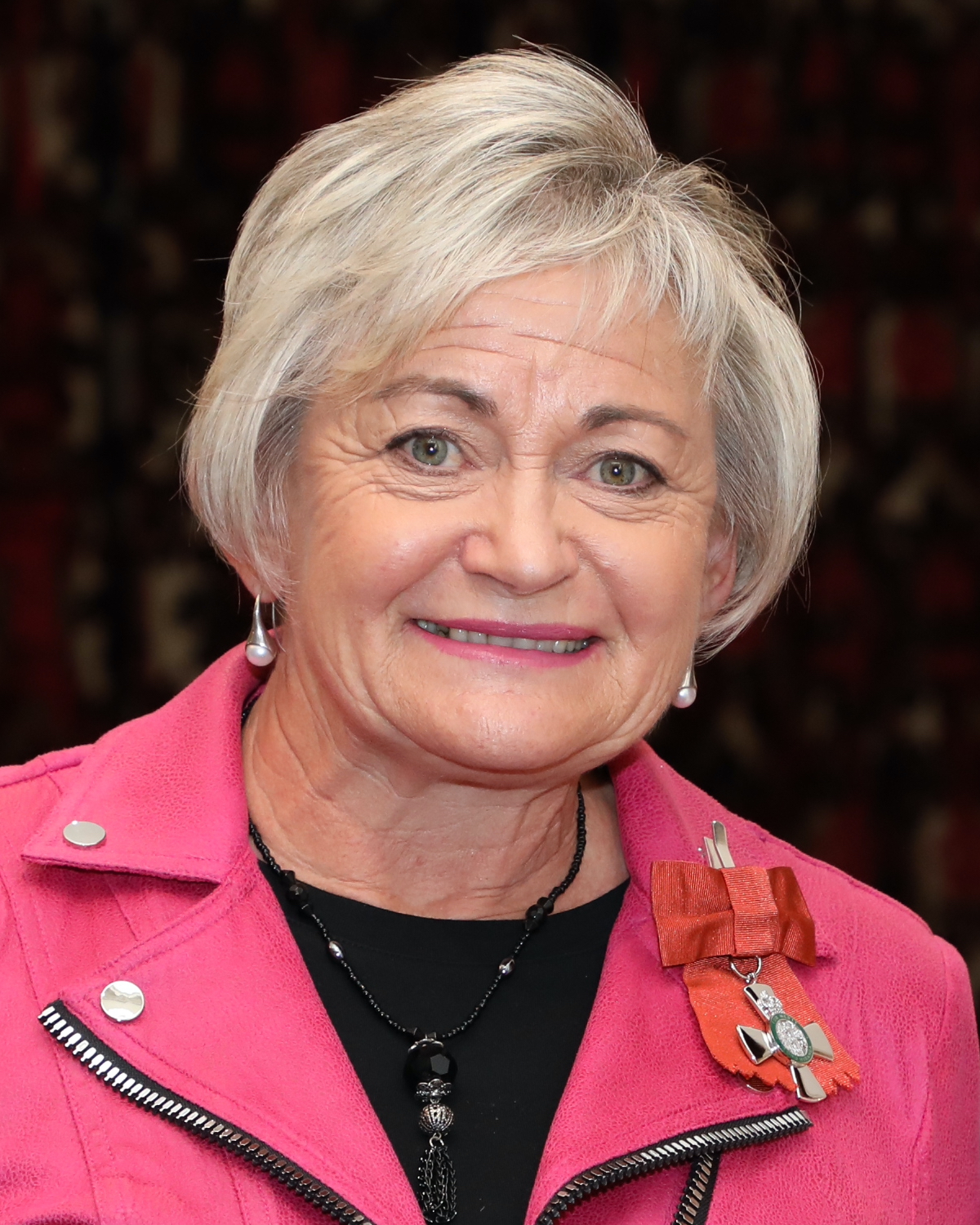
Jan Barnes

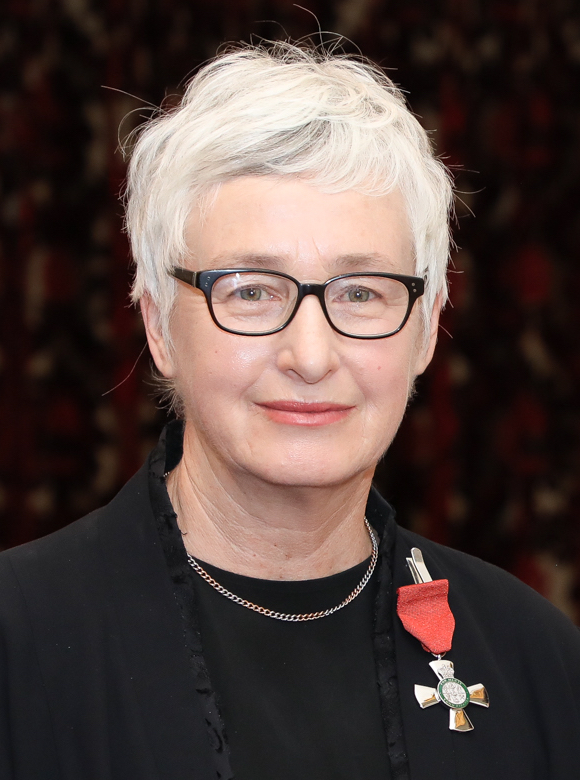
Tina Barton

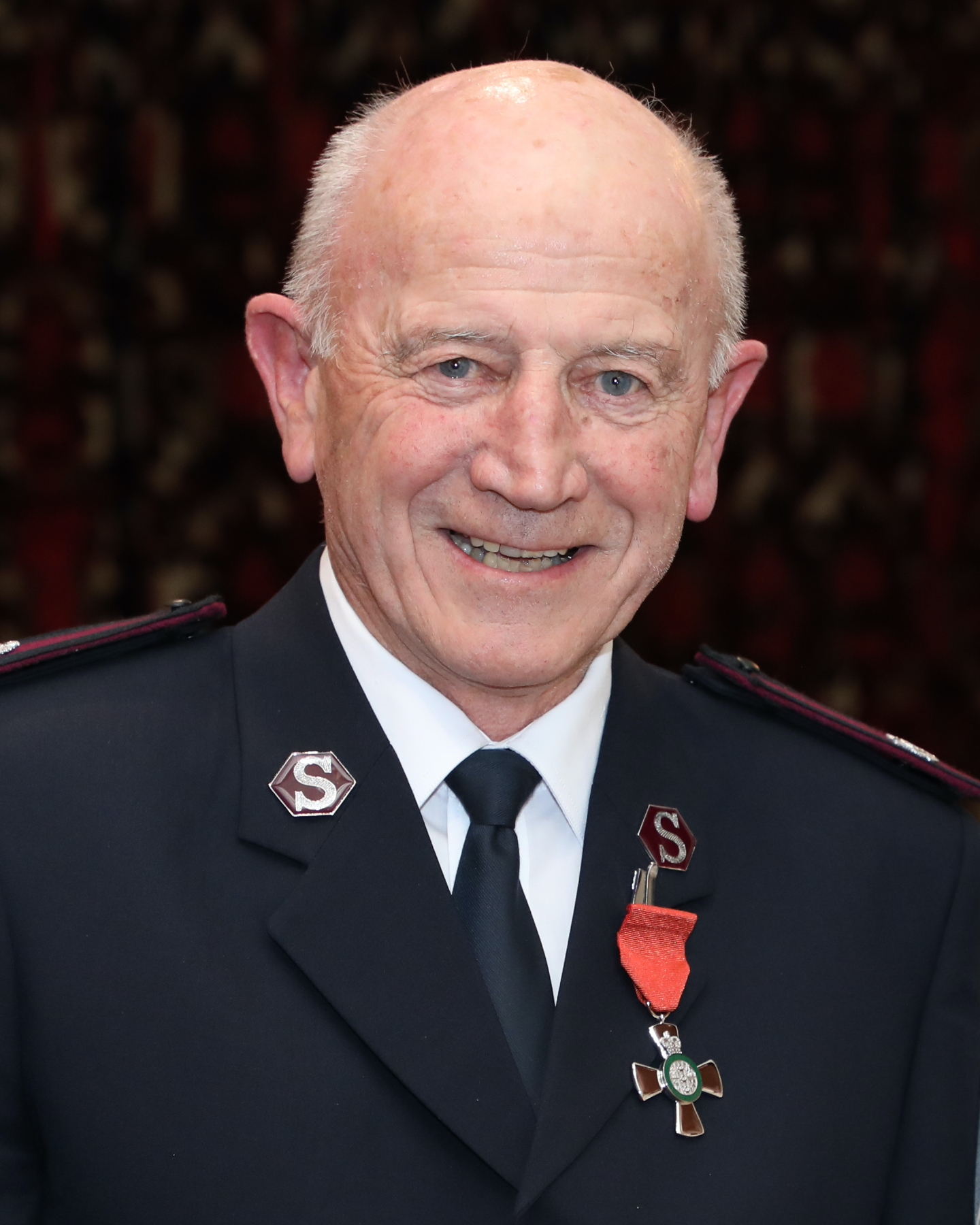
David Bennett

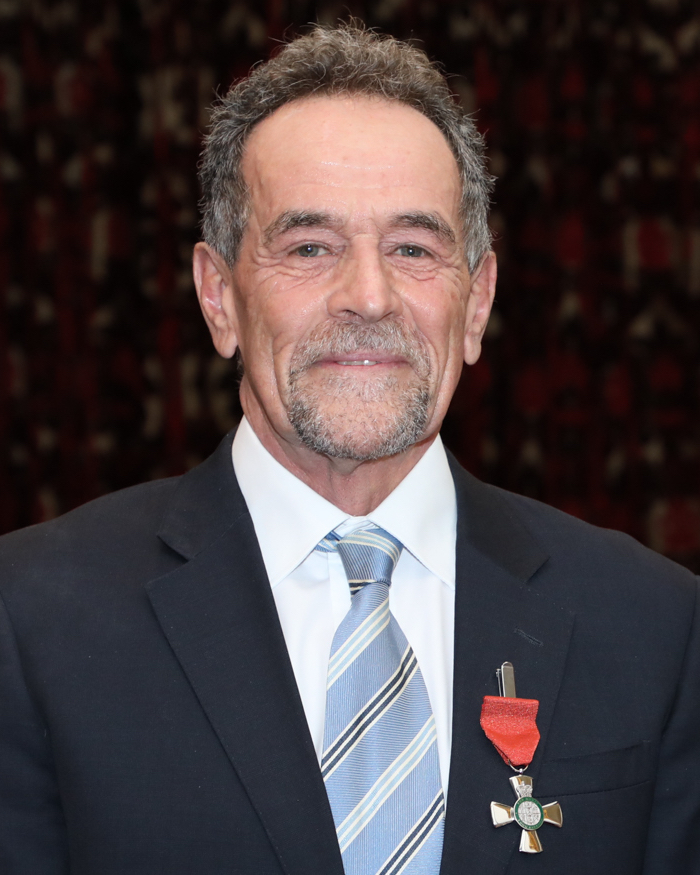
Mark Bowden

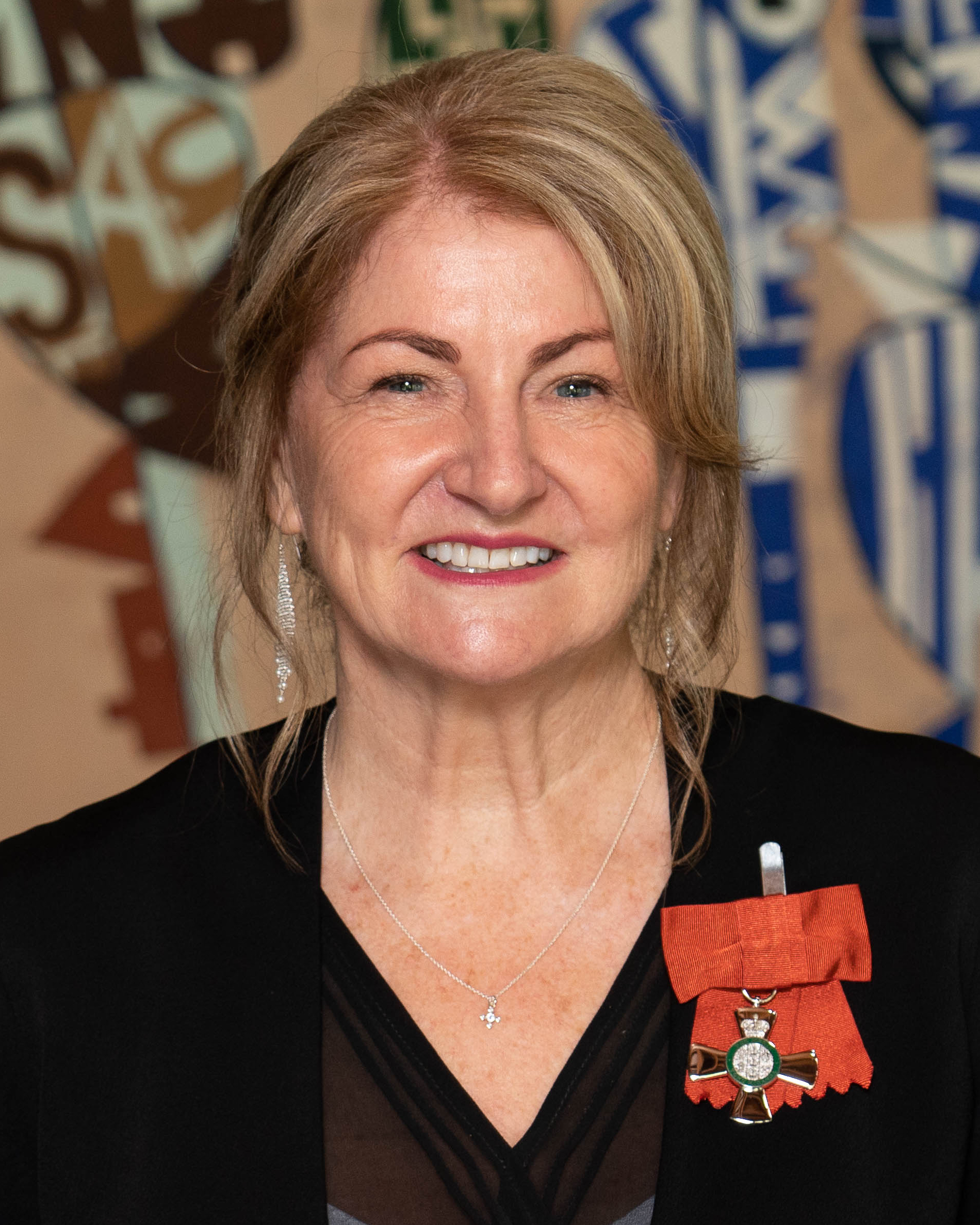
Sheena Cameron

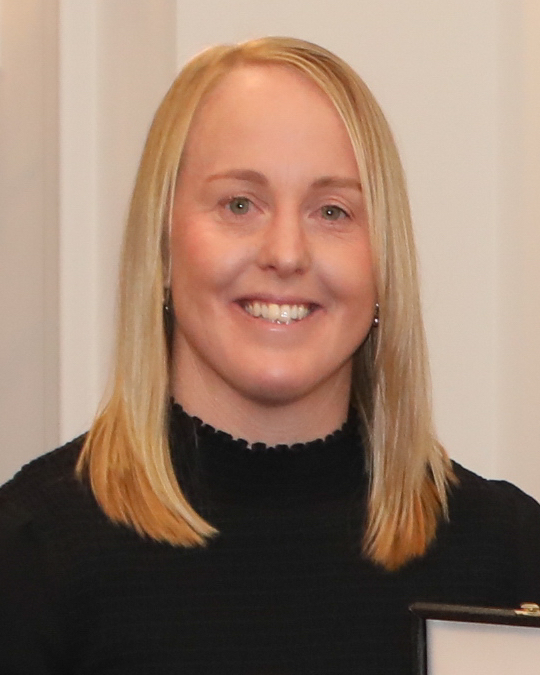
Kendra Cocksedge

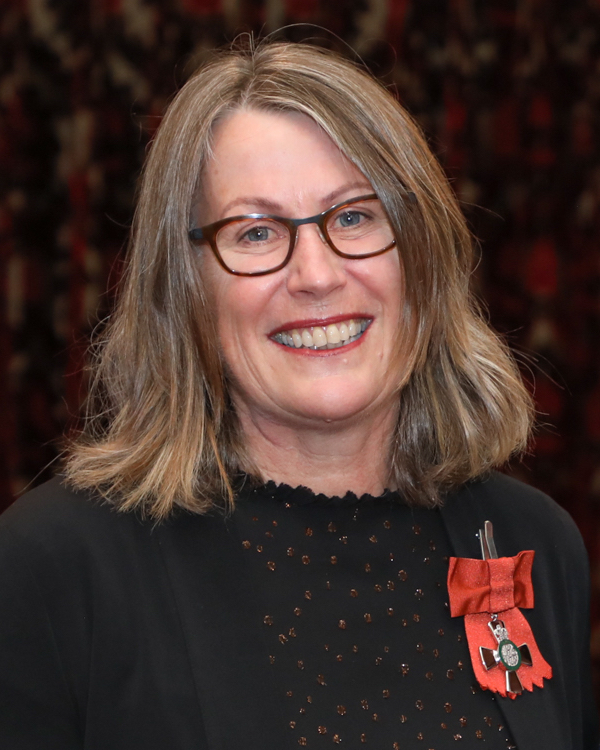
Michelle Crook

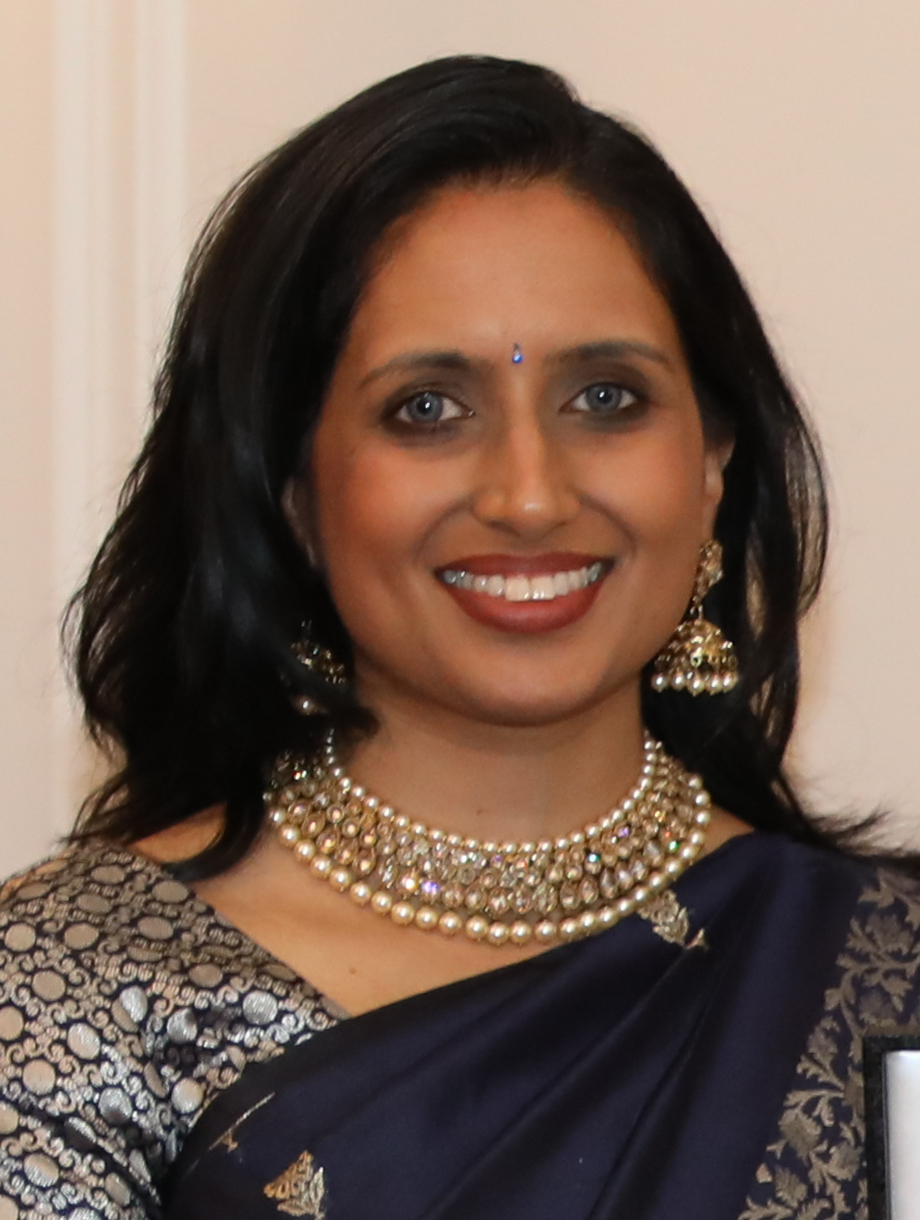
Vanisa Dhiru

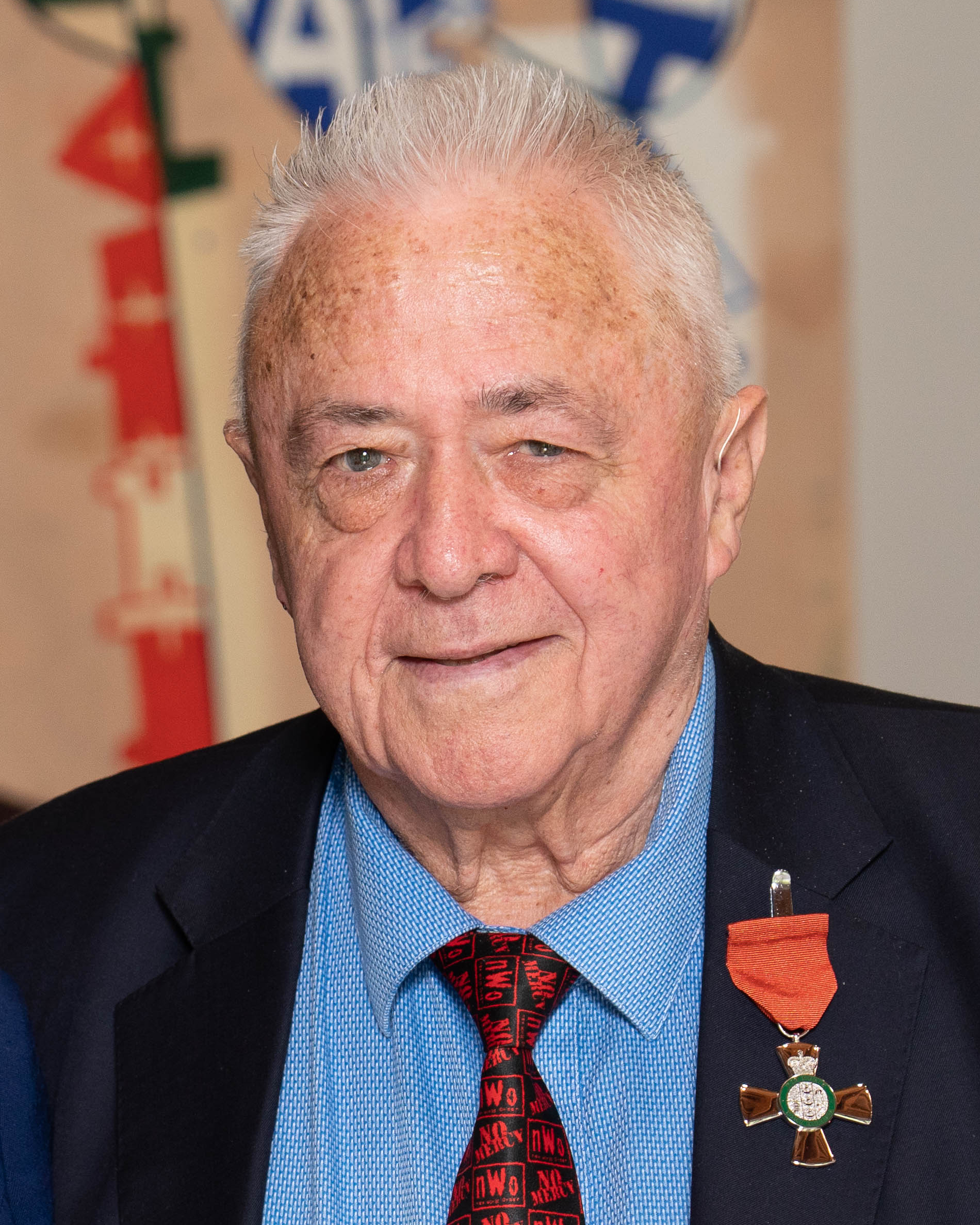
Ted Edwards

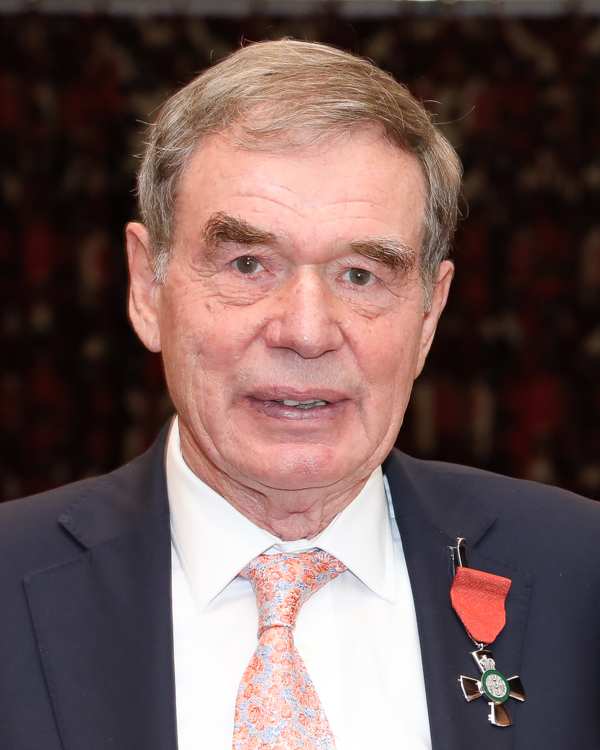
Ken Forrest

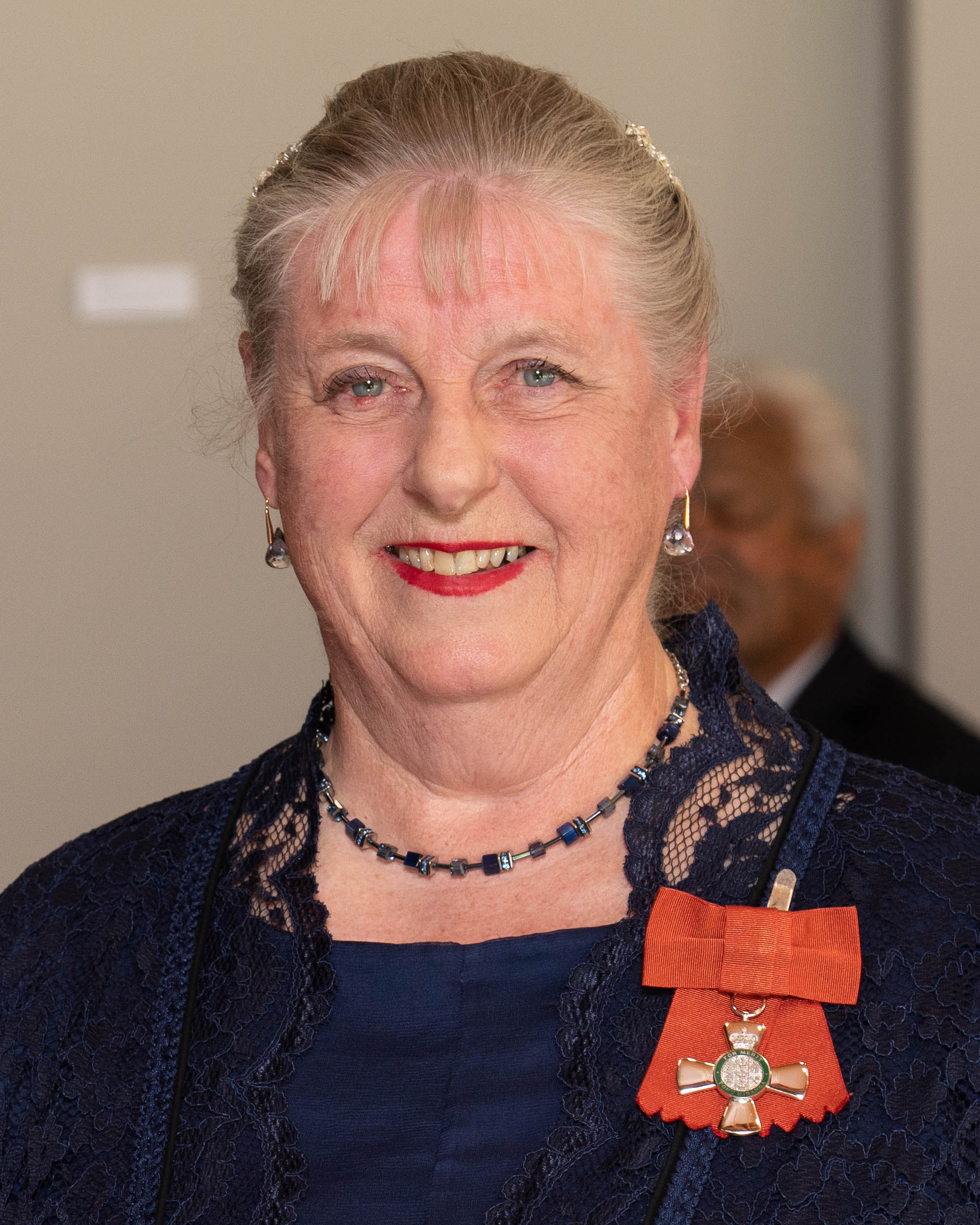
Prudence Gooch

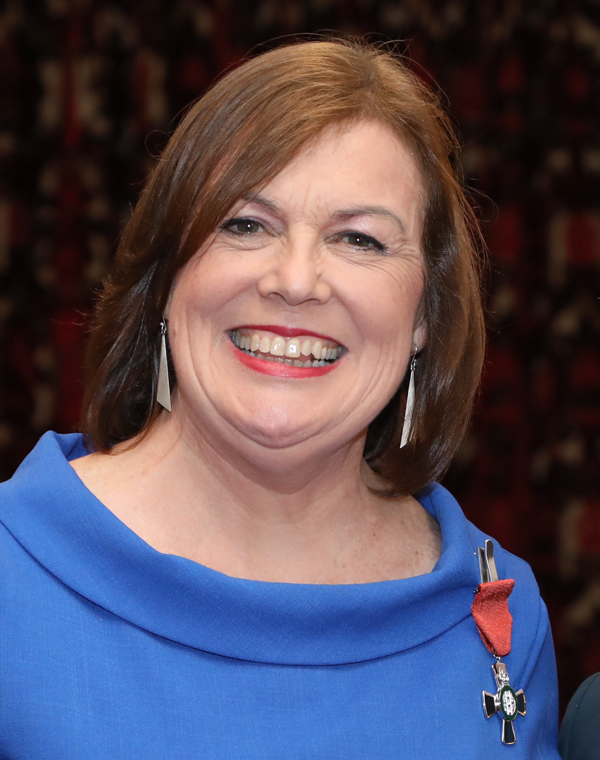
Bronwyn Hayward

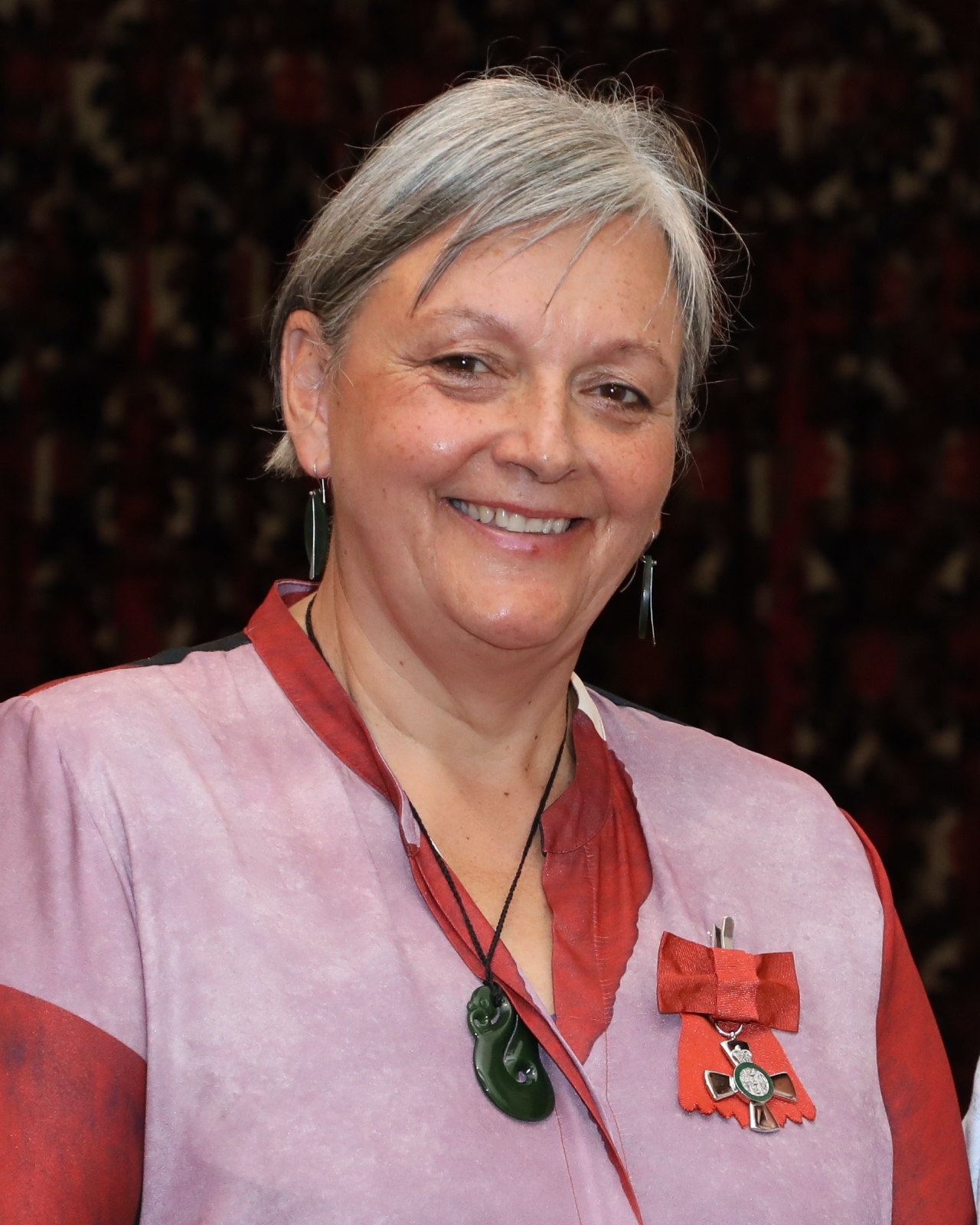
Vicki-Anne Heikell

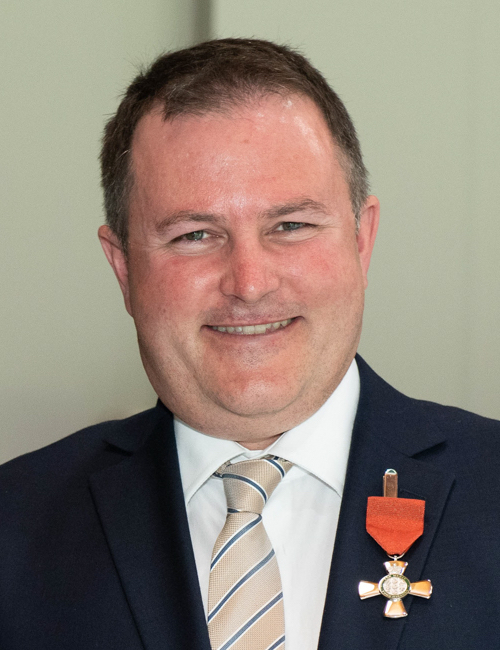
Shaun Hendy

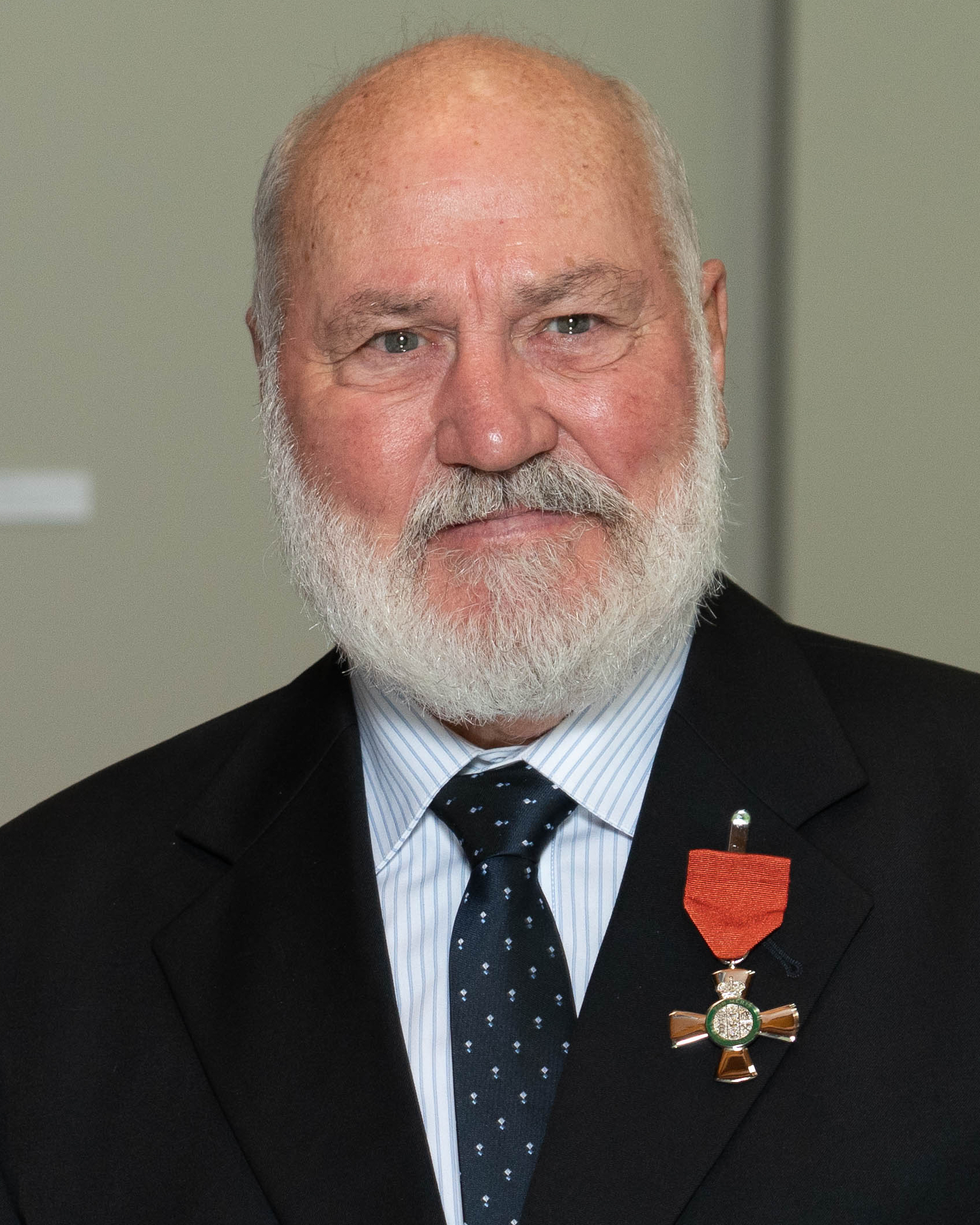
Keith Ingram

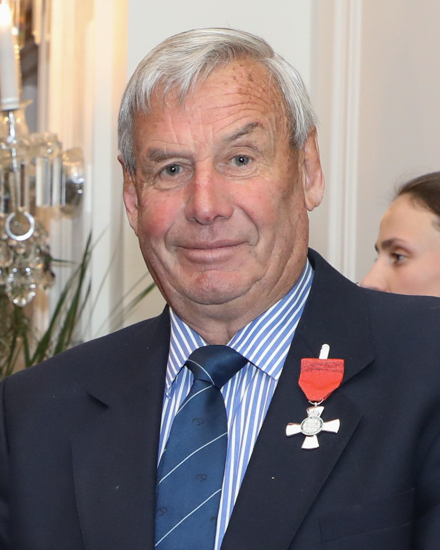
Dickson Jardine

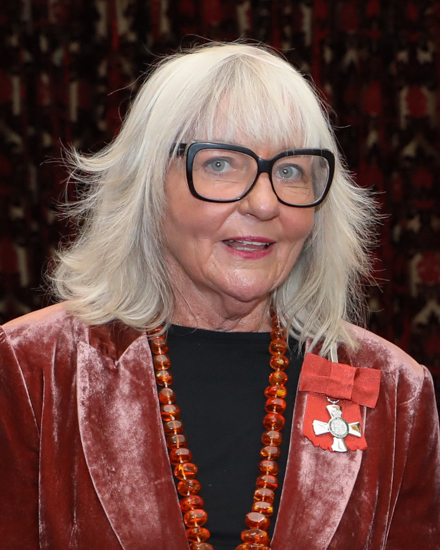
Jillian Jardine

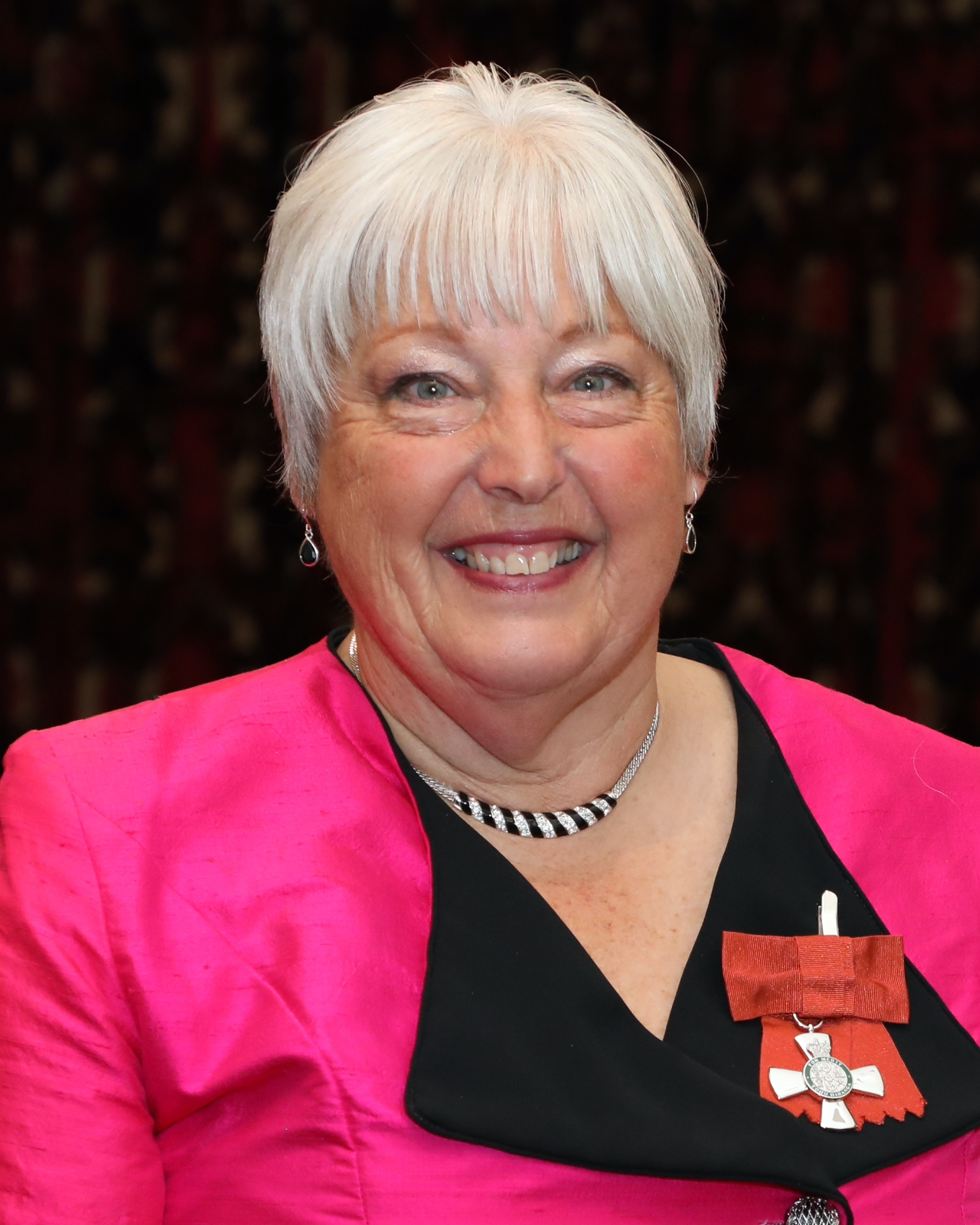
Helen Johnson

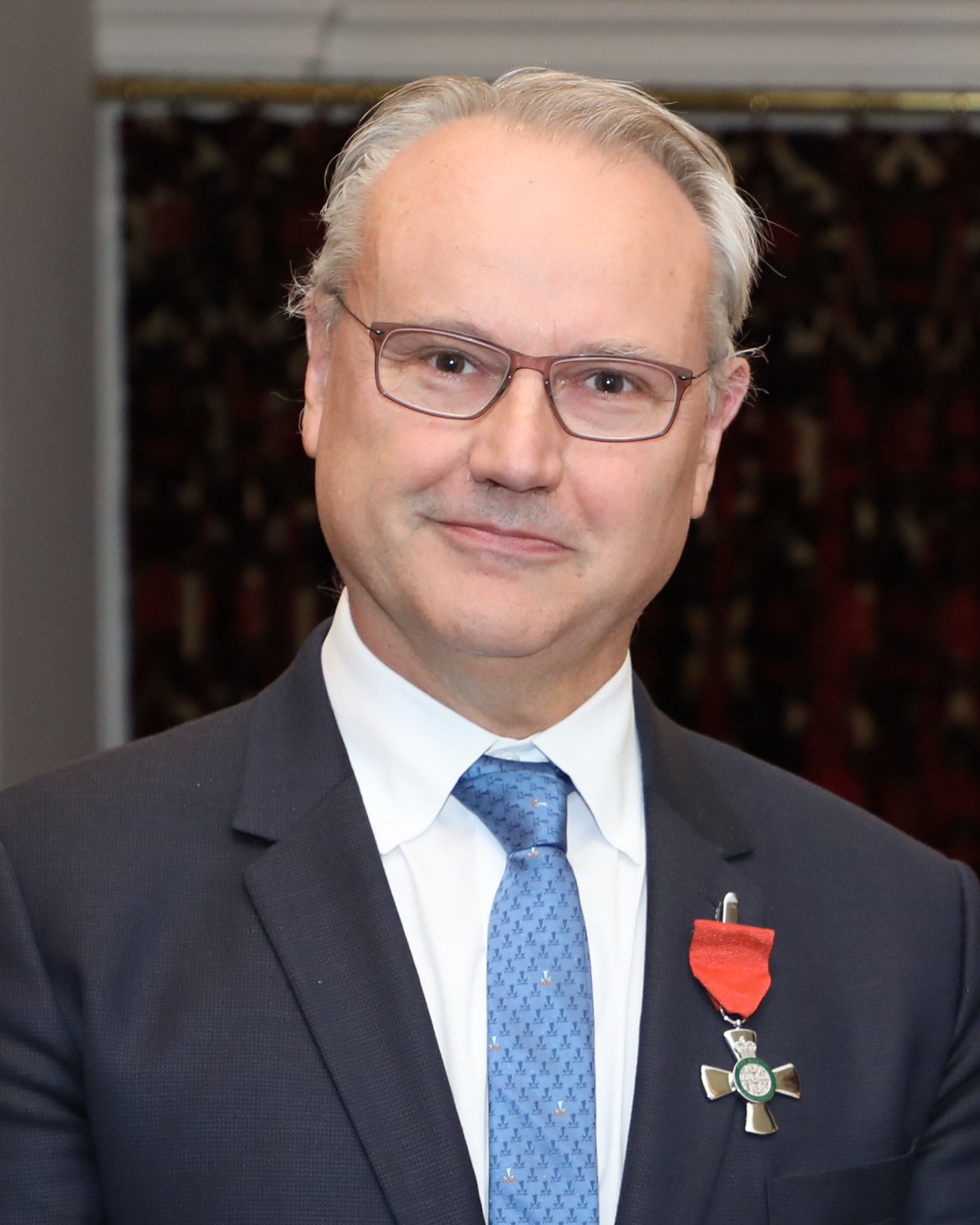
Rodney Jones

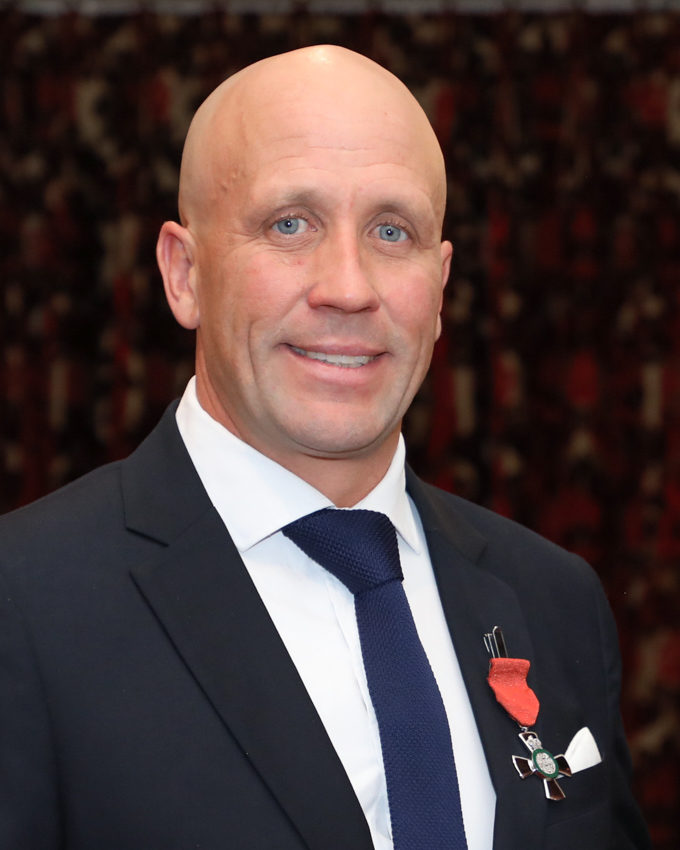
Sam Judd

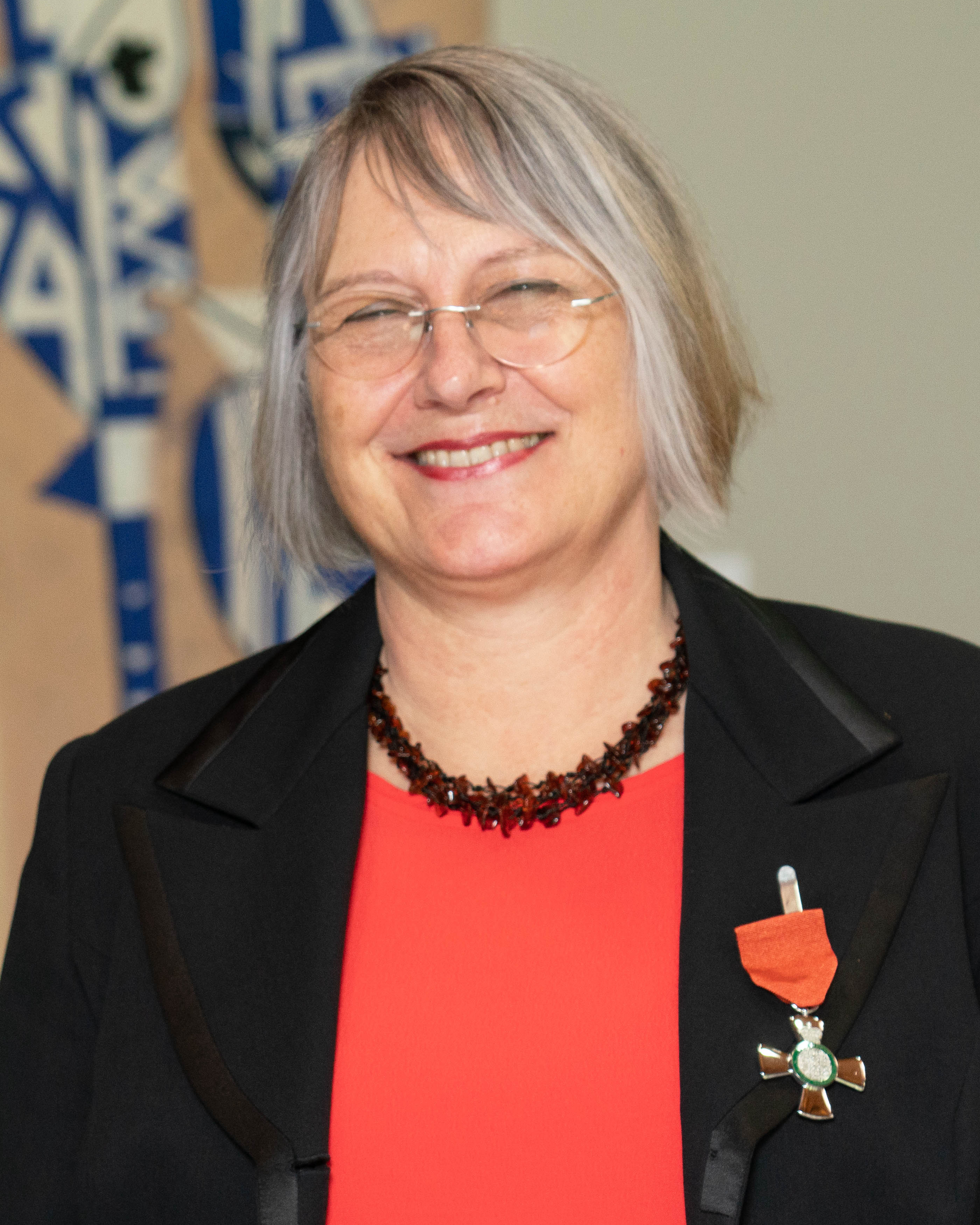
Glenda Keam

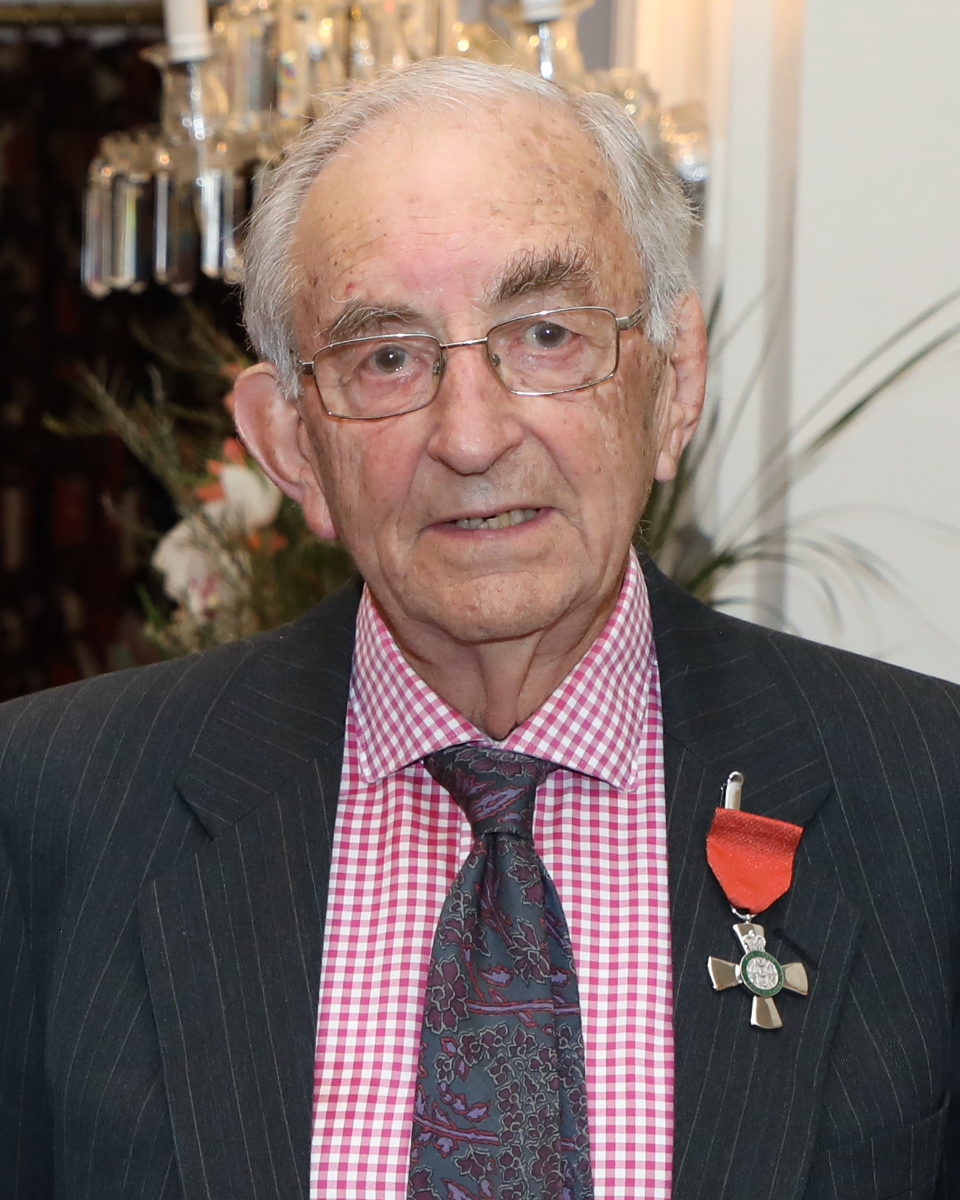
Jim Kebbell

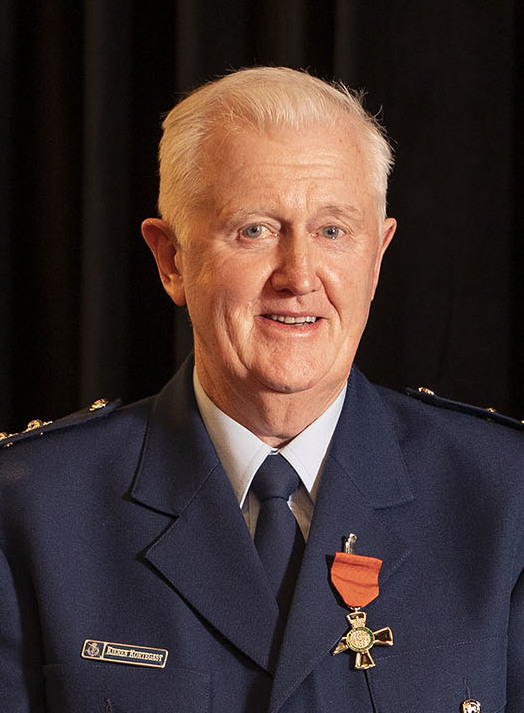
Kieren Kortegast

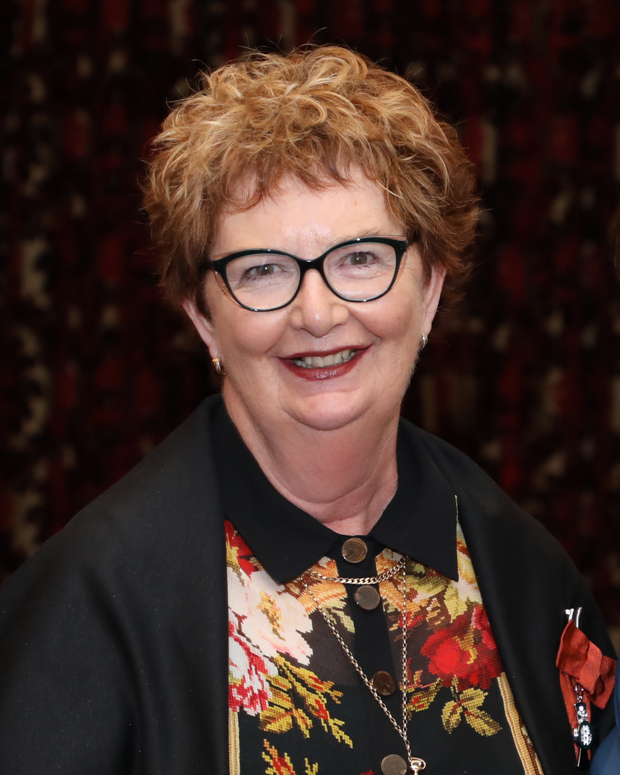
Janet Lane

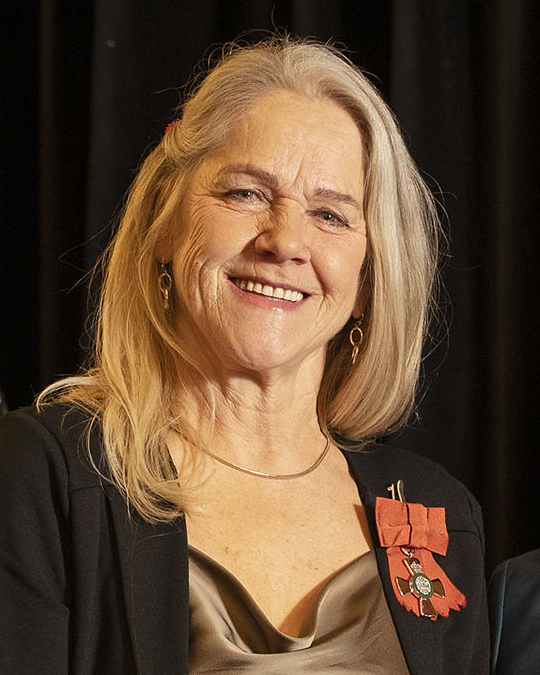
Josje Lelijveld

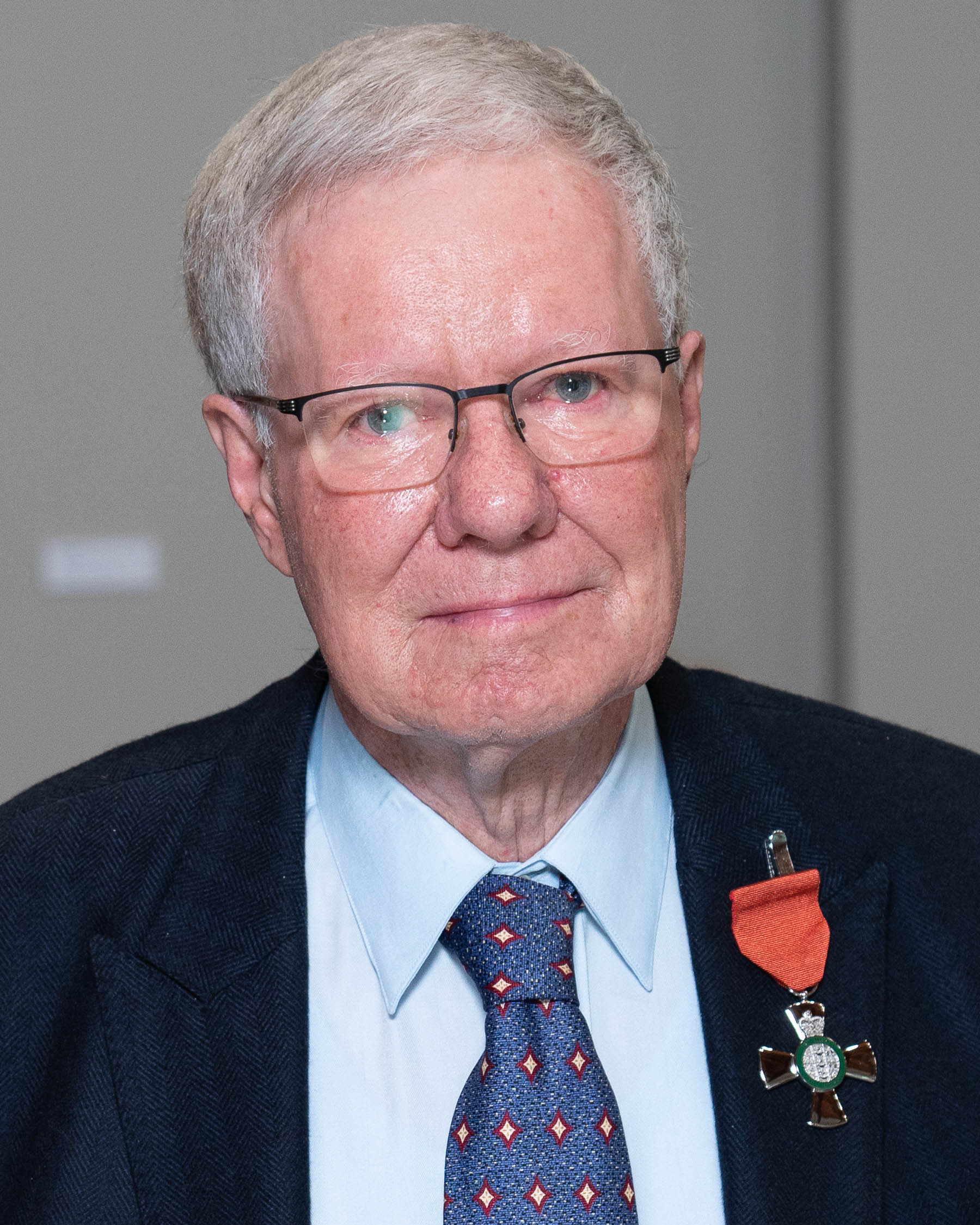
Keith Locke

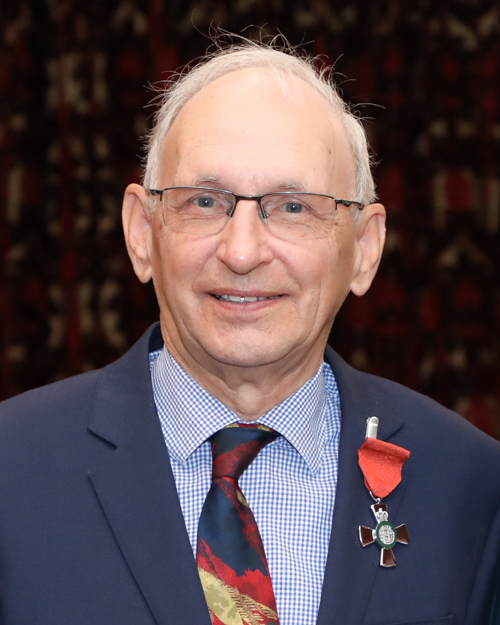
Don Mackenzie

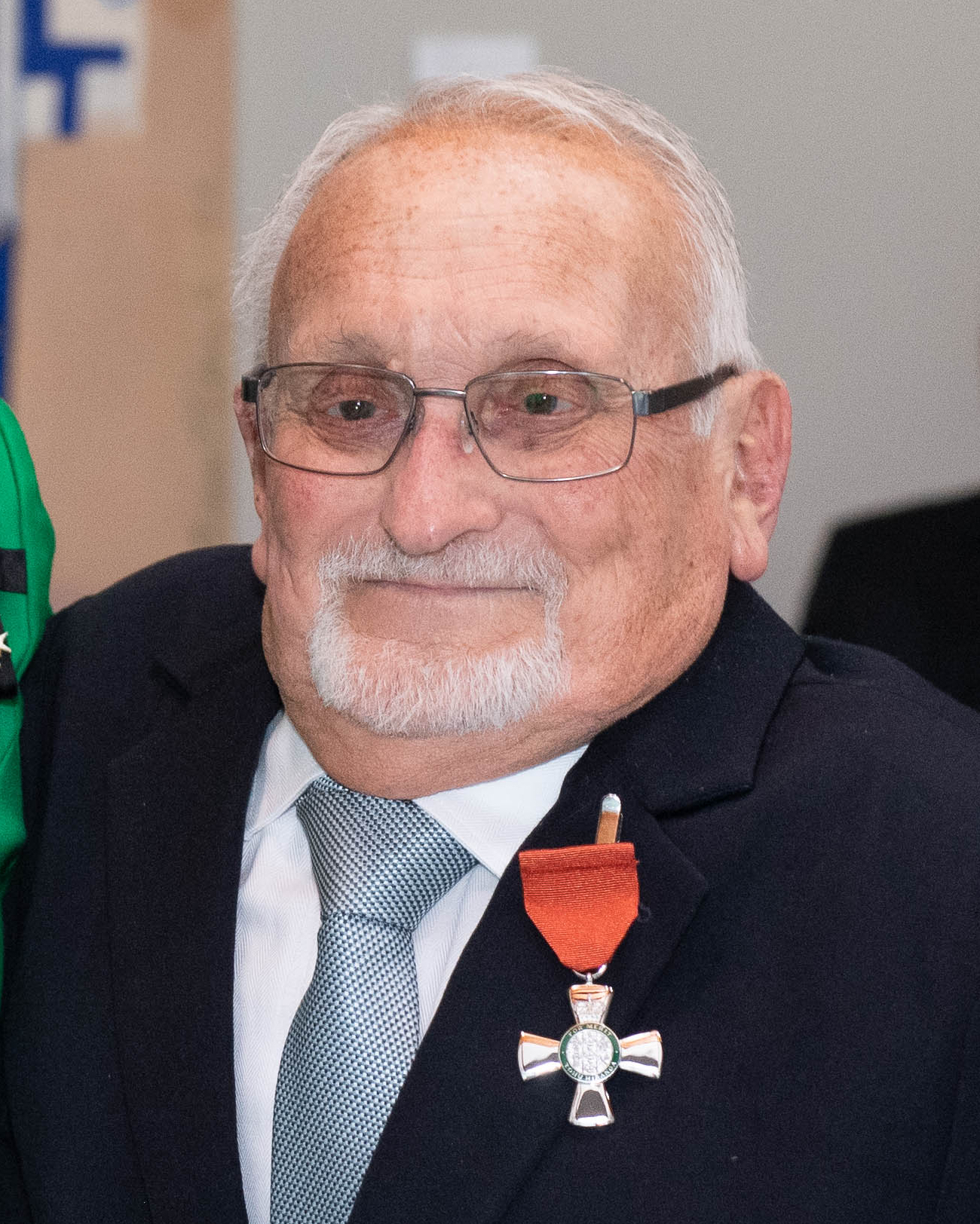
John McIntosh

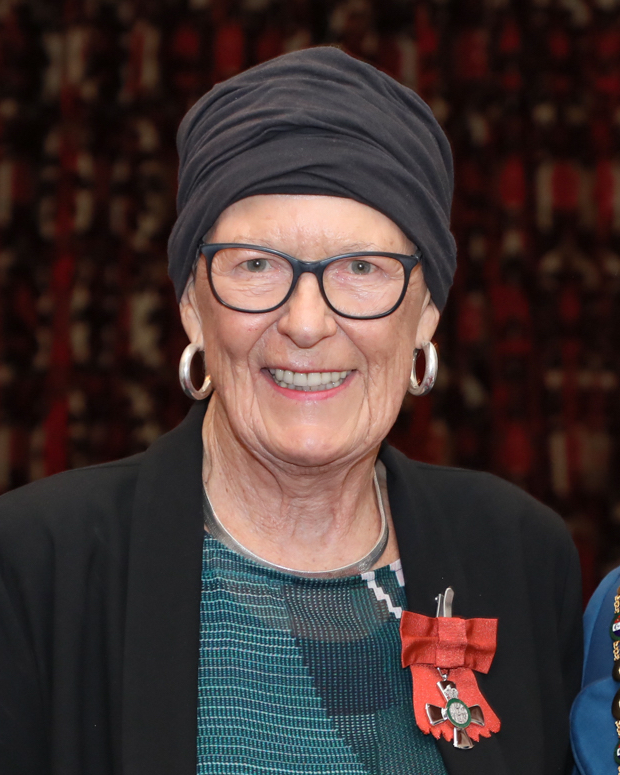
Jann Medlicott

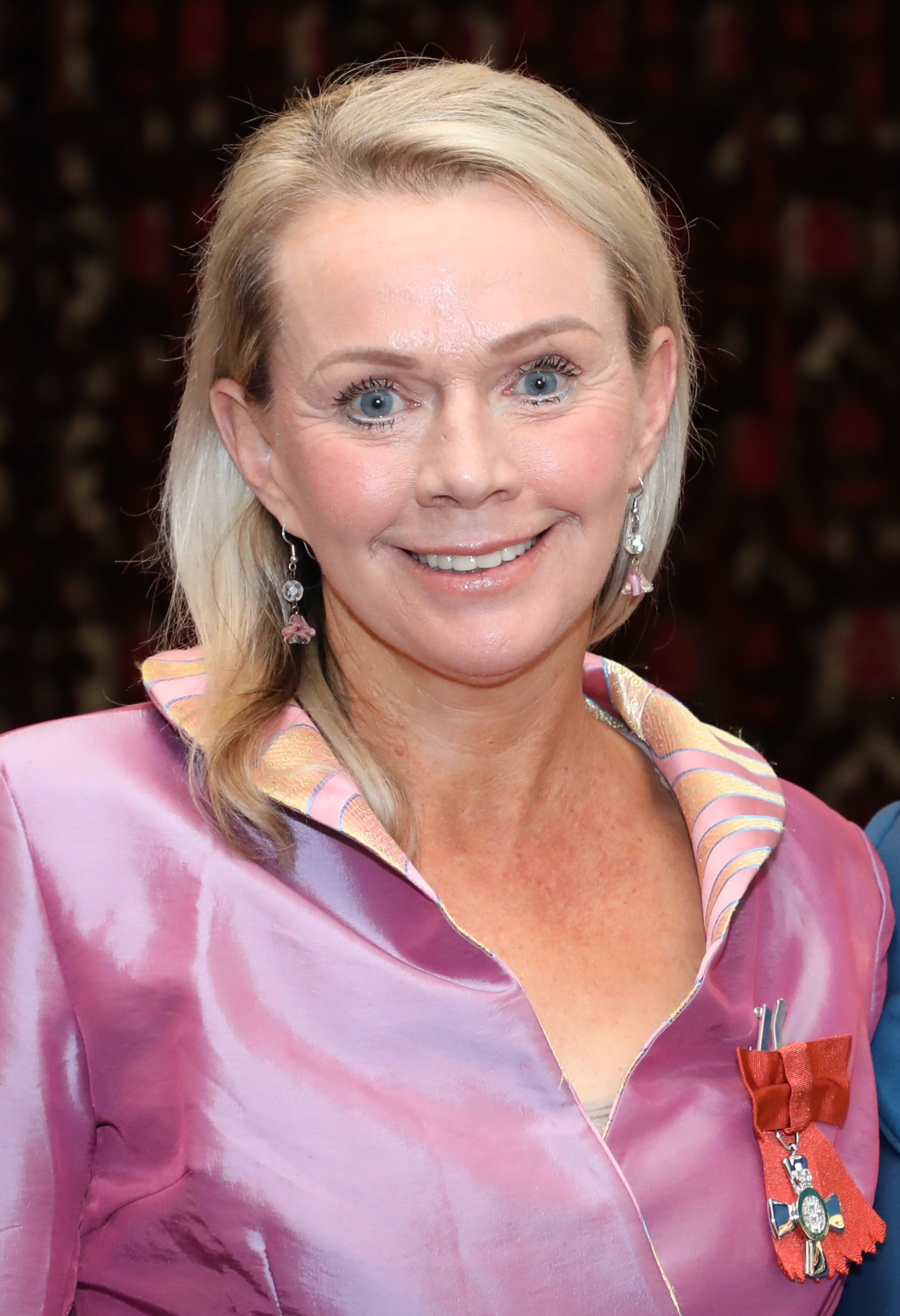
Melissa Moon

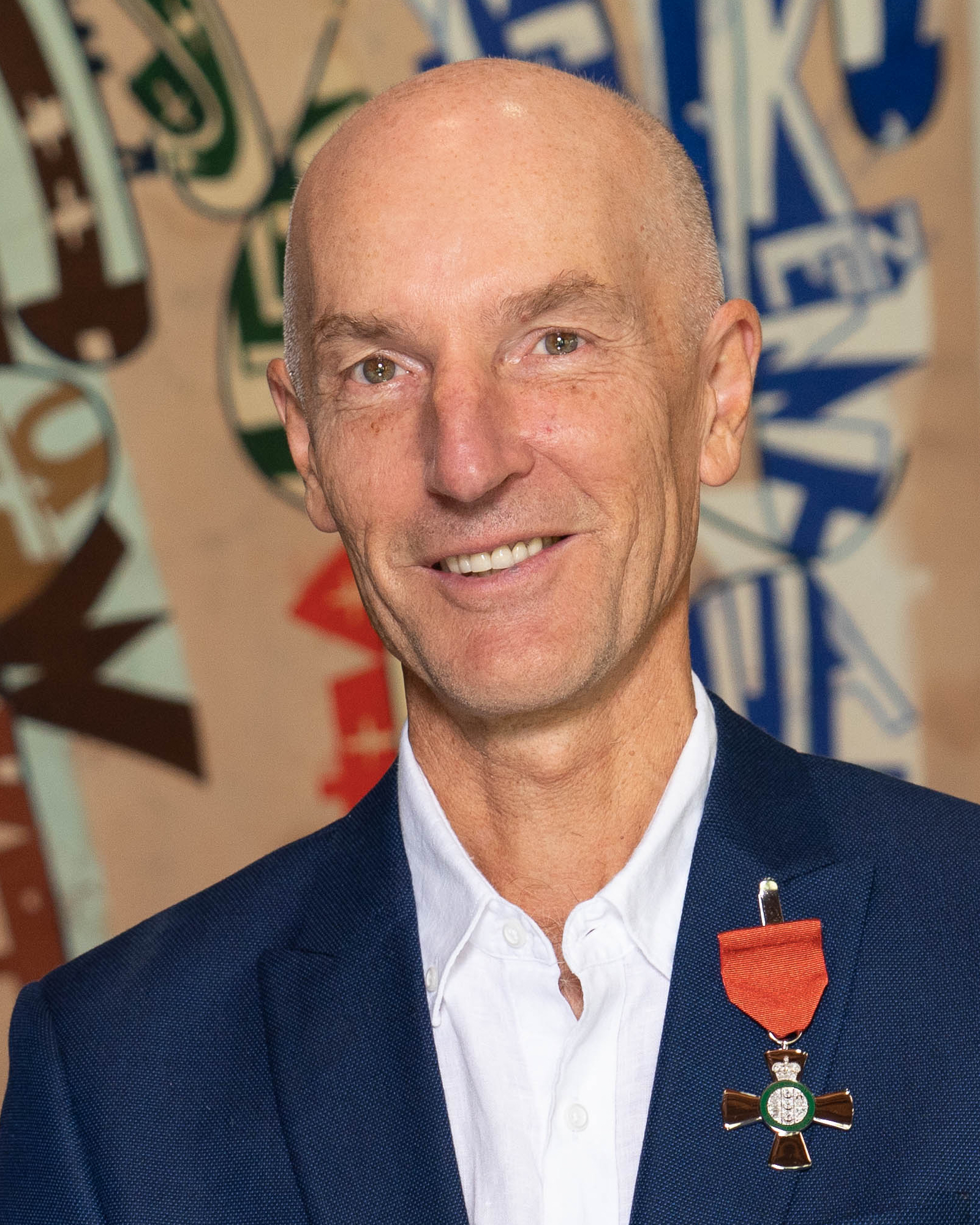
Chris Morrison

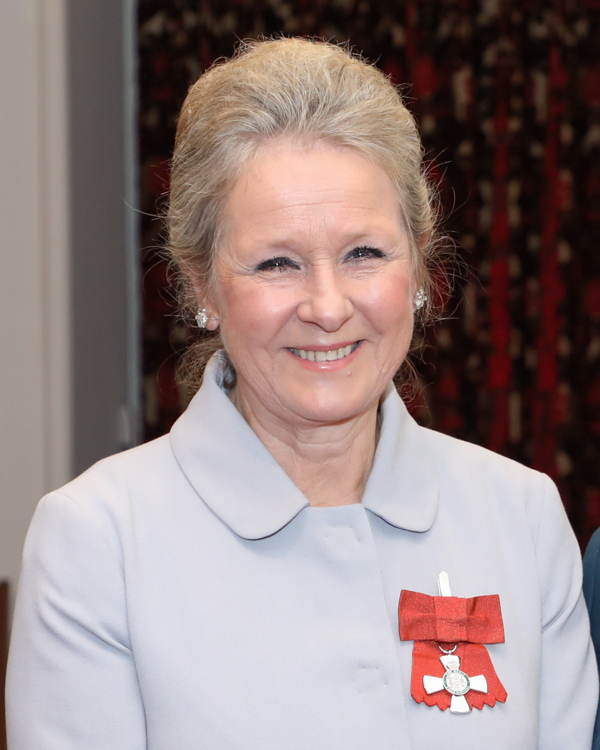
Jan Murphy

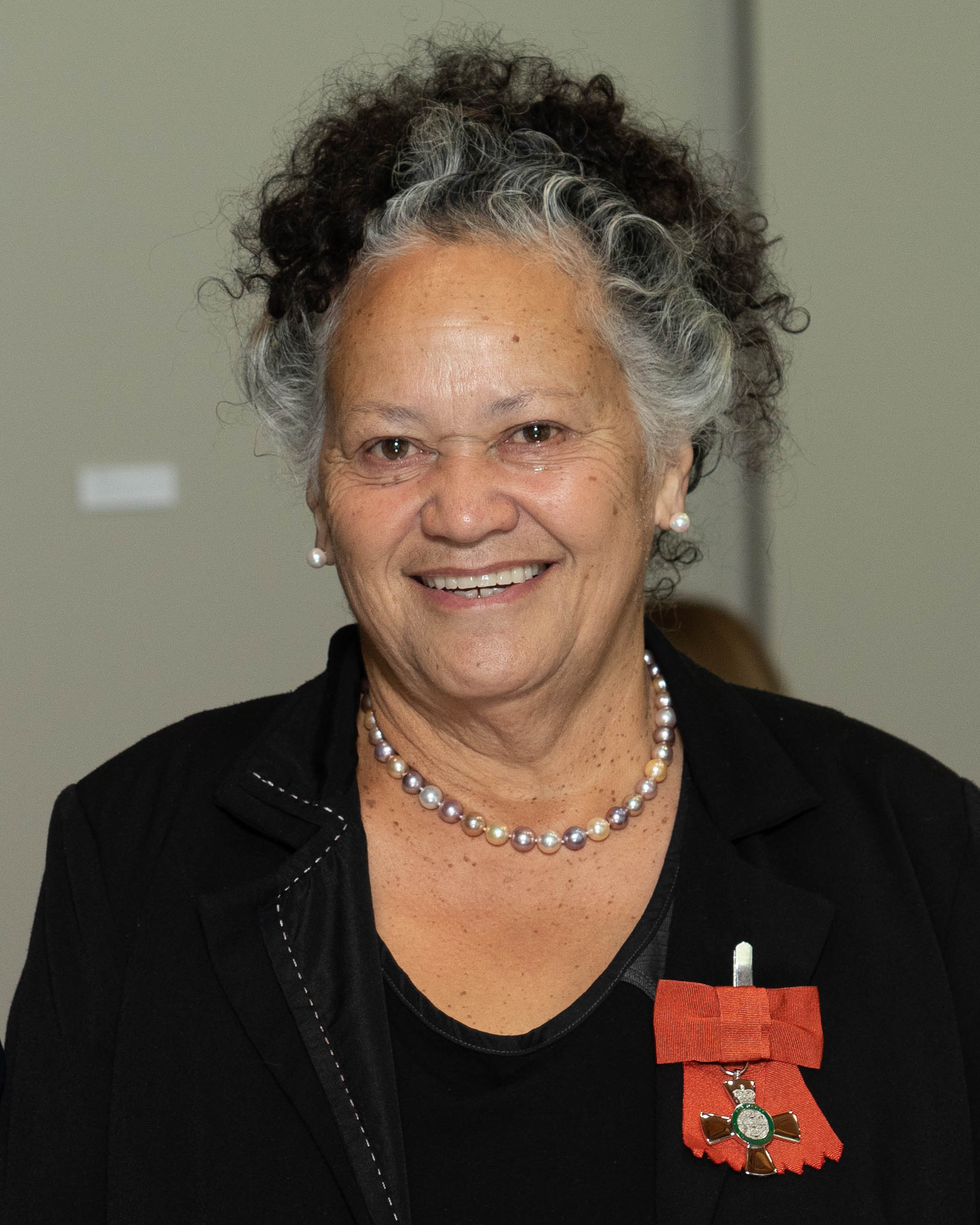
Katie Murray

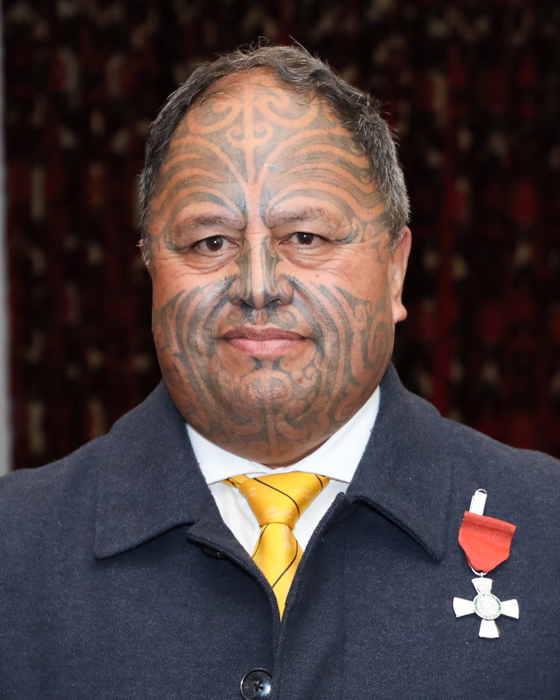
Wayne Ngata

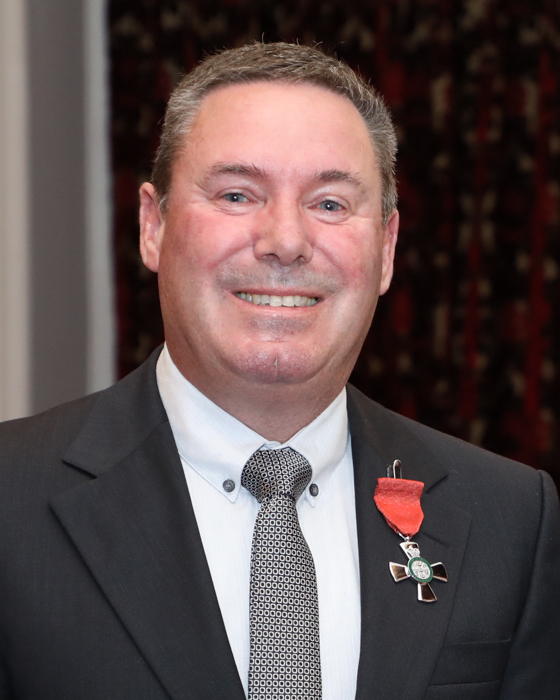
Paul Norris

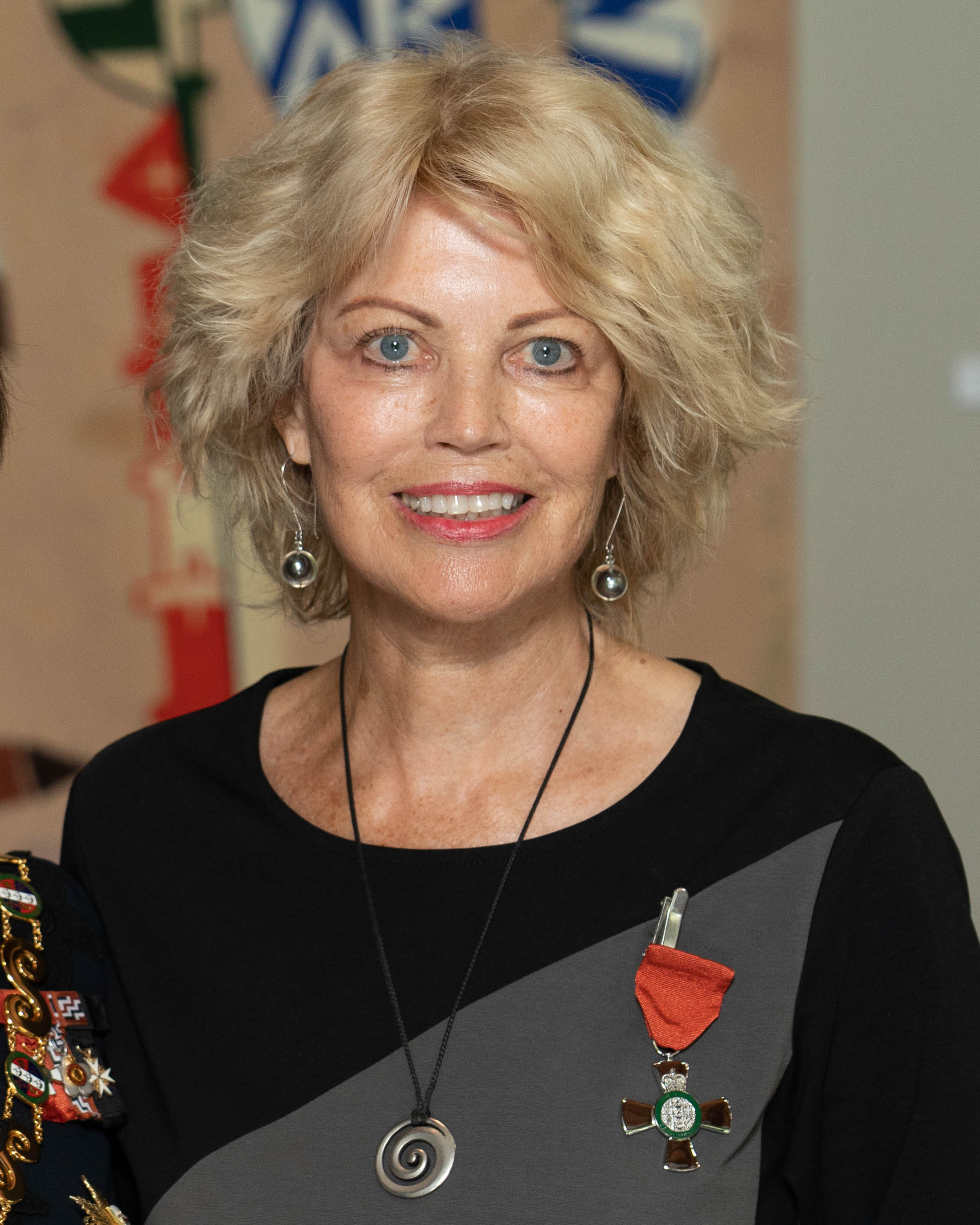
Denise Ritchie

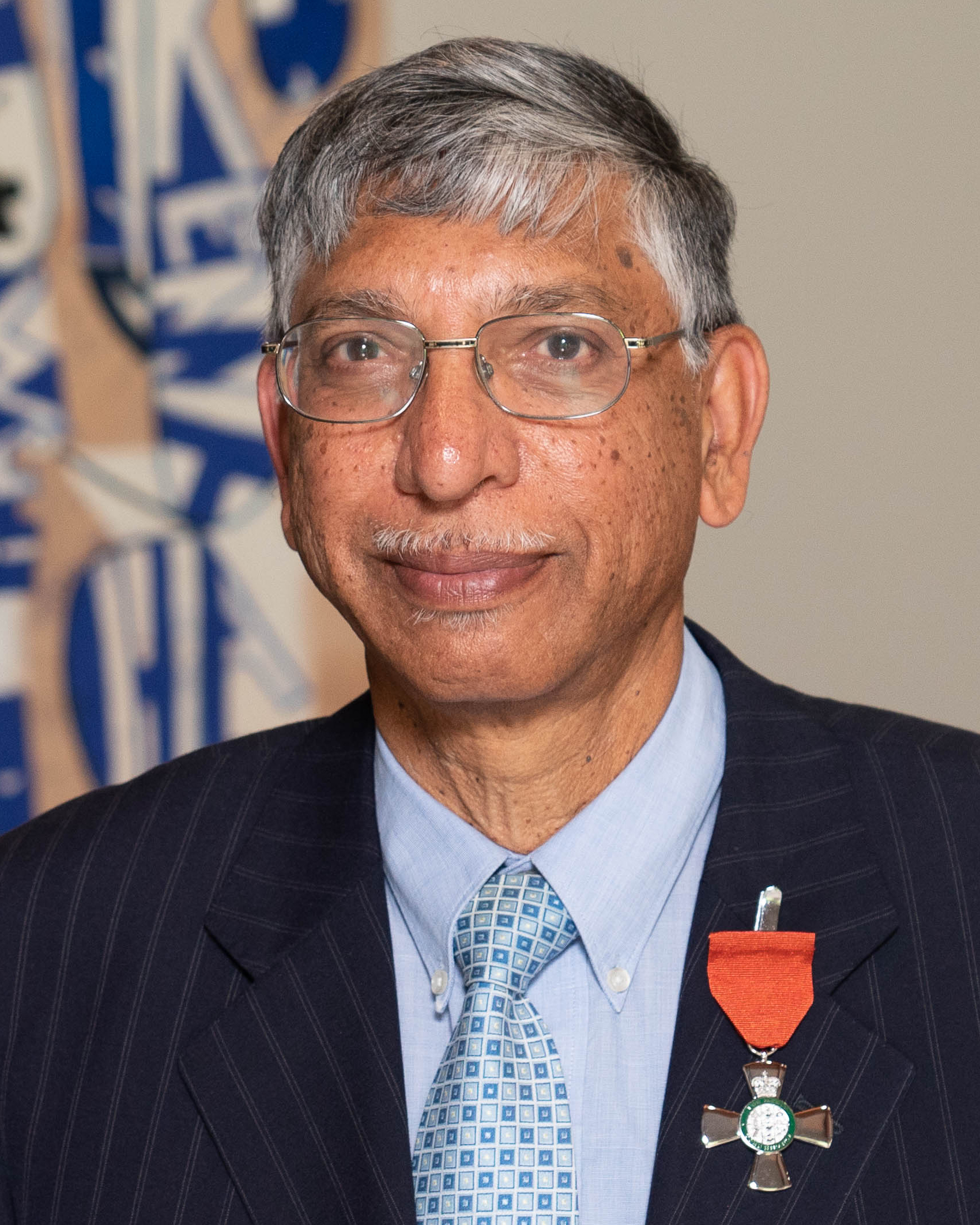
Gagrath Singh

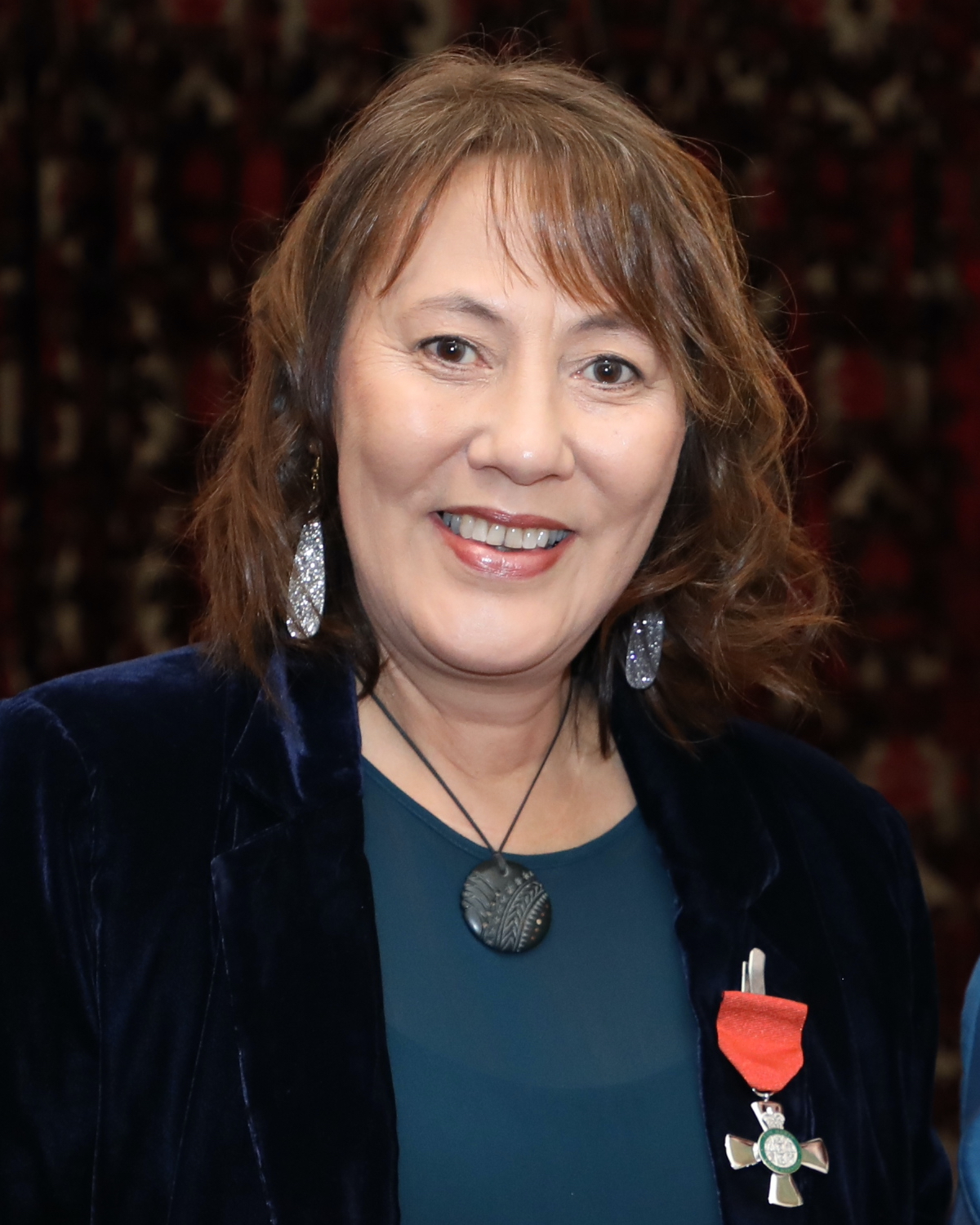
Pauline Smith

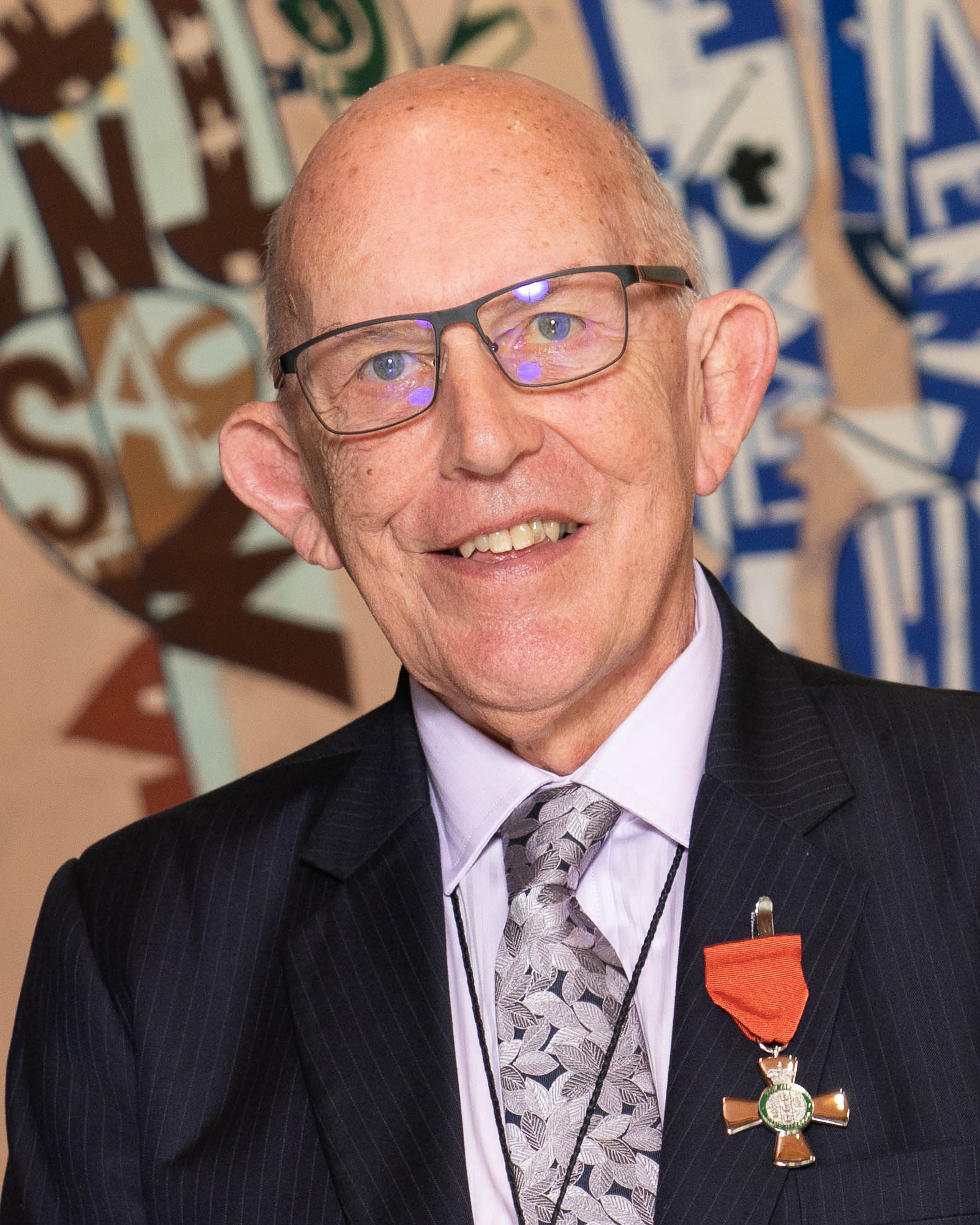
Mike Sutton

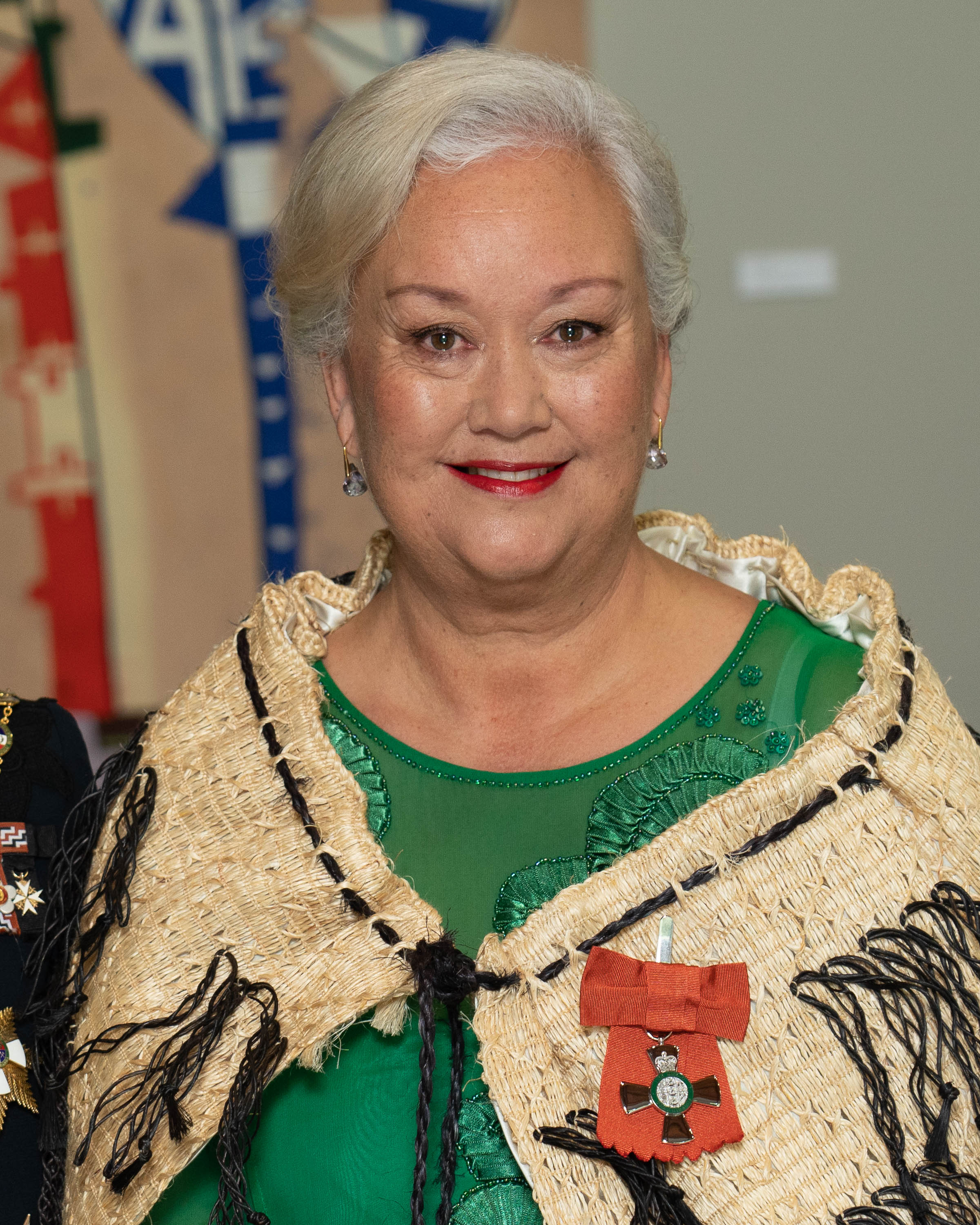
Moana Tamaariki-Pohe

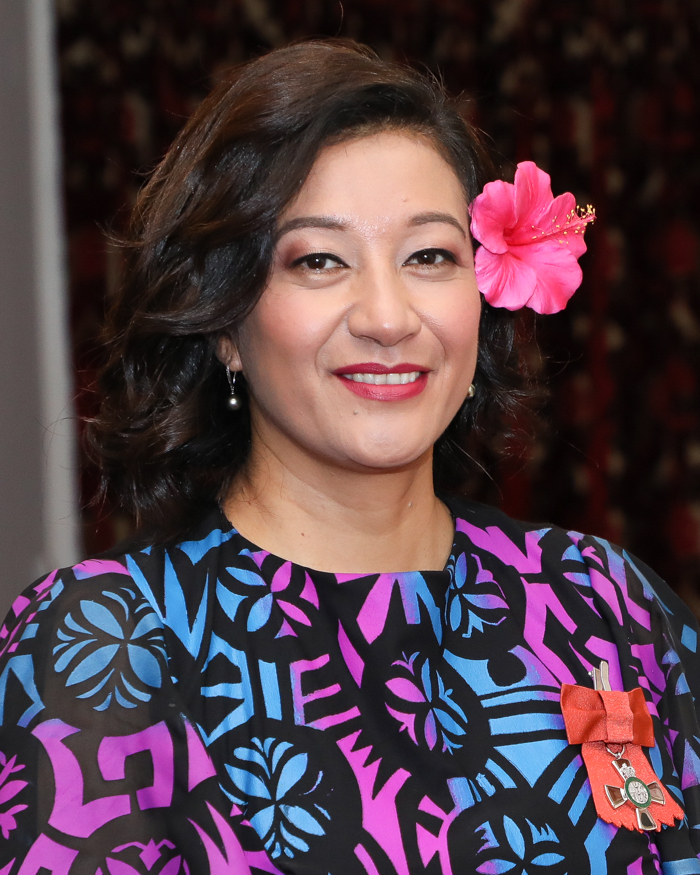
Tasileta Teevale

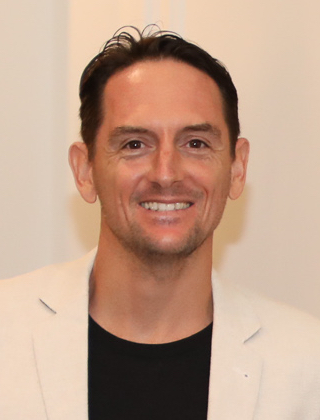
William Trubridge

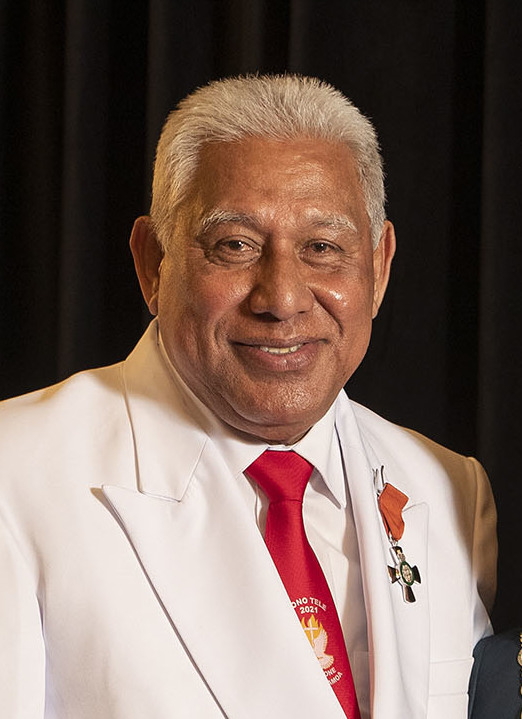
Tumama Vili

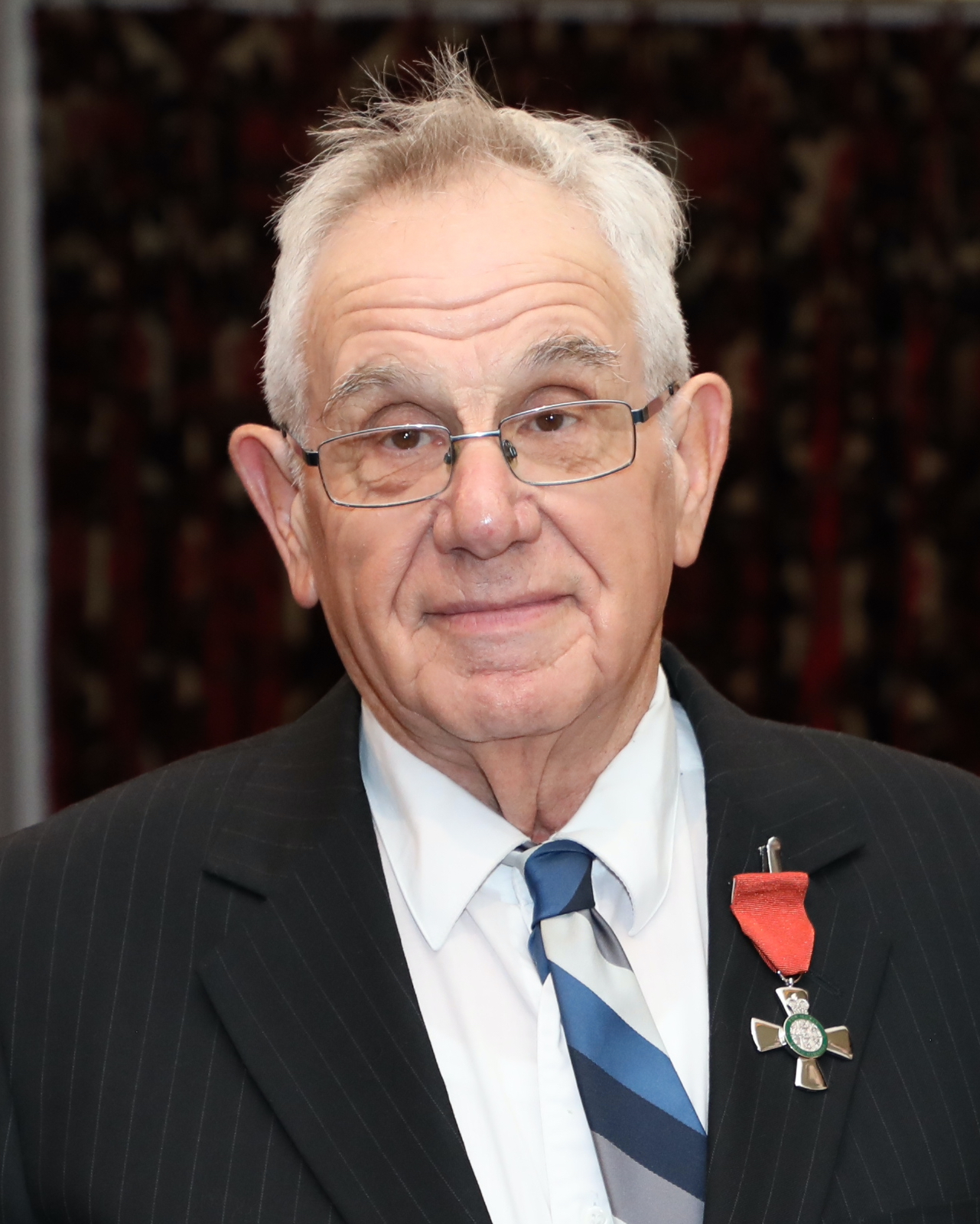
Gary Watts

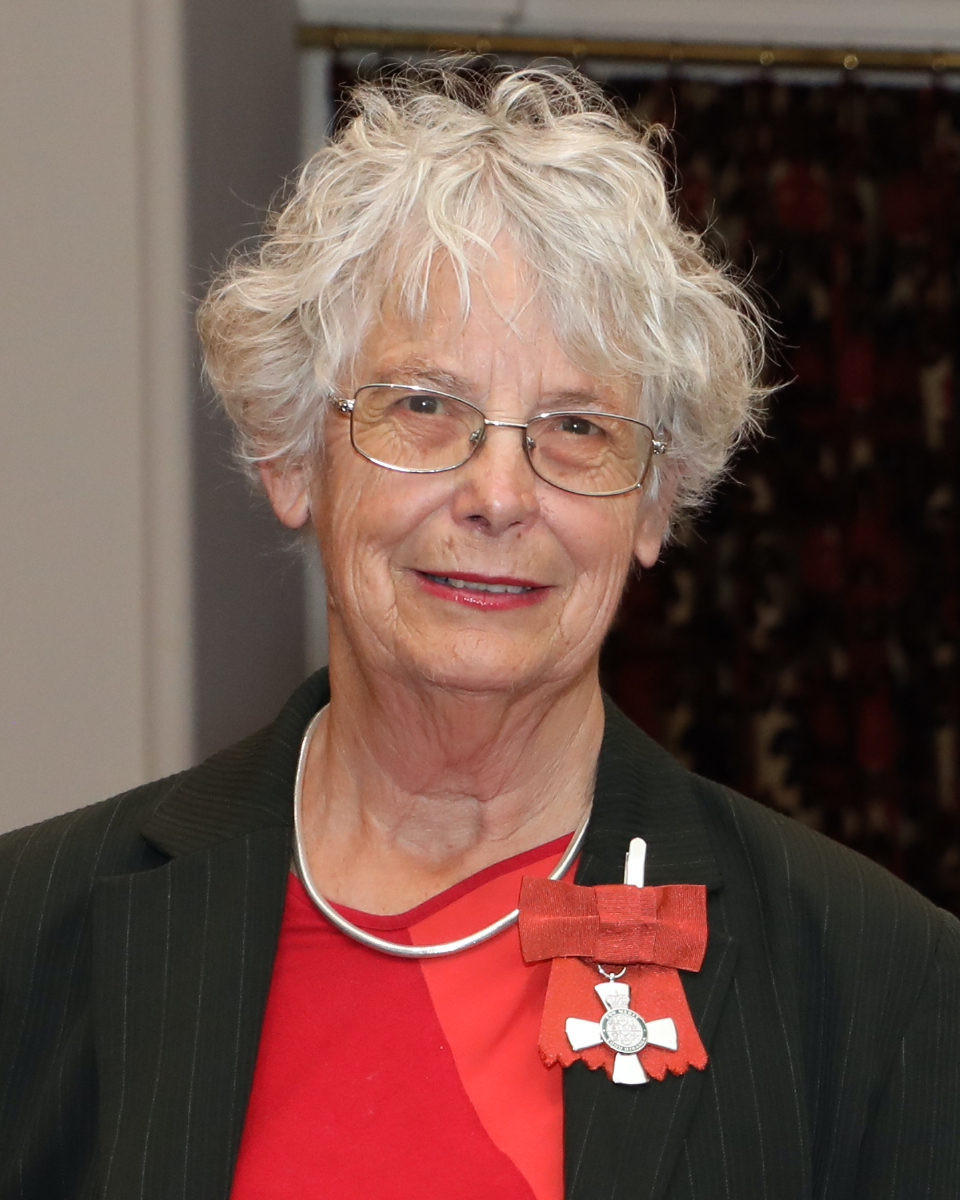
Marion Wood

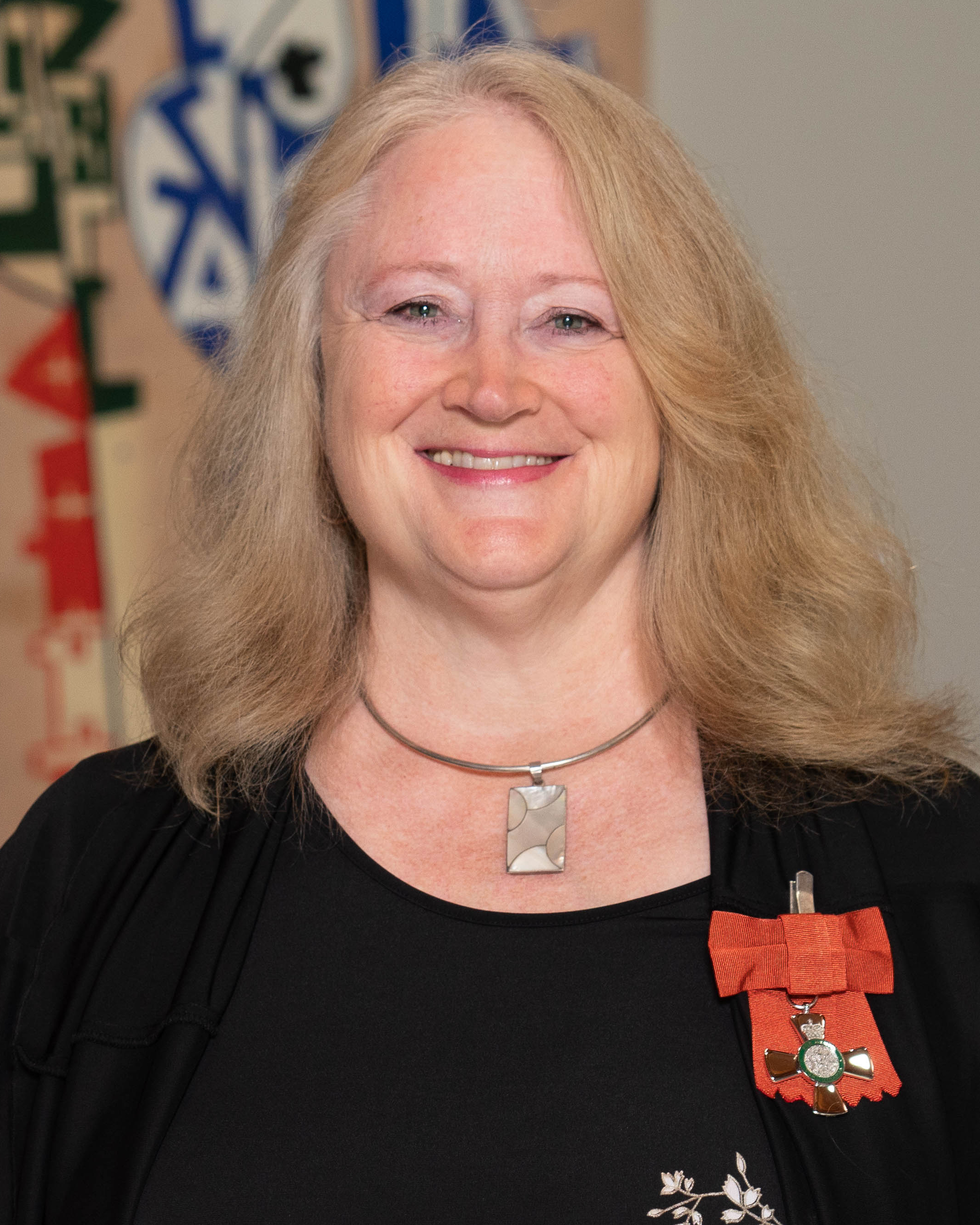
Susan Krumdieck

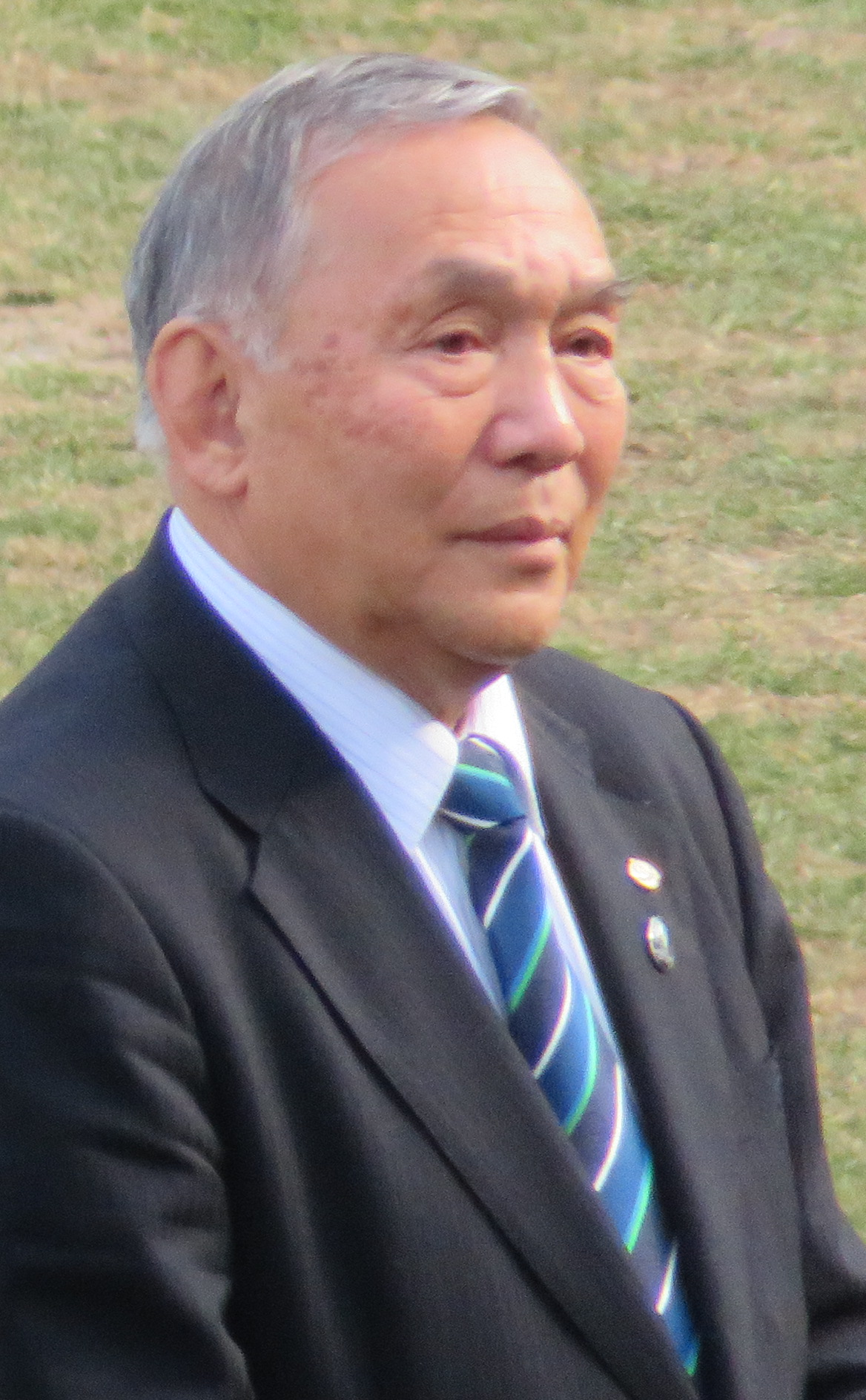
Yoshihiro Sakata

== Companion of the Queen's Service Order (QSO) ==
- Francis Anthony Fanning – of Khandallah. For services to the community.
- Jeffrey William Sanders – of Eastbourne. For services to social service governance.
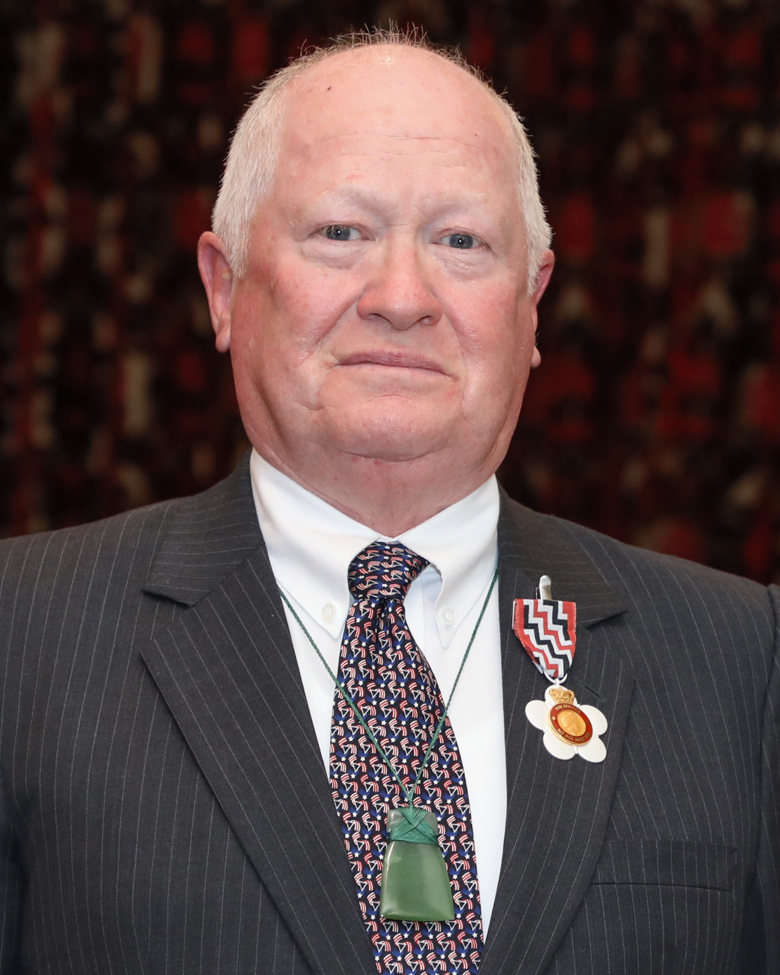
Francis Fanning

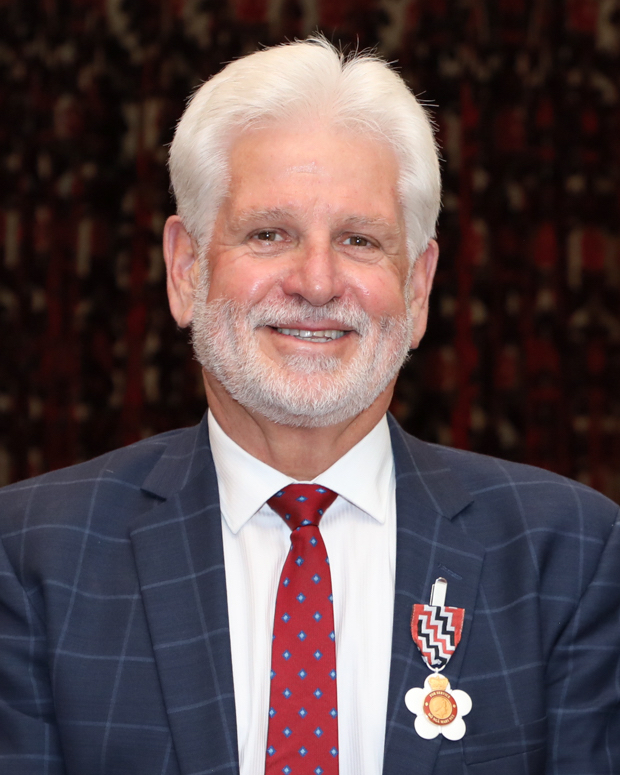
Jeff Sanders

== Queen's Service Medal (QSM) ==
- Gillian Mary Adshead JP – of Warkworth. For services to conservation.
- Kevin John Adshead – of Warkworth. For services to conservation.
- Robin Boldarin JP – of Miramar. For services to the community and school sports.
- Michael Joseph Bourke – of Rangiwahia. For services to wildlife conservation.
- Daniel John Bowmar – of Kaiwaka. For services to Fire and Emergency New Zealand and the community.
- Yvonne Barbara Boyes JP – of Ōhope. For services to health, particularly nursing and cancer treatment.
- William Sydney Clement Burdett – of Ruatoria. For services to the community and local government.
- Carol Winifred Charman – of Napier. For services to youth and people with intellectual disabilities.
- Sau Man Chow – of Half Moon Bay, Auckland. For services to immigrant communities.
- Kerry Patrick Clarkin JP – of Huntington. For services to agriculture and the community.
- Lester Dean – of Invercargill. For services to the Pacific community.
- Michael Nevill Drake – of Taupō. For services to education and the community.
- Paul Duffy – of Edendale. For services to the community and local government.
- Dr Anna Thornton Dyzel – of Hokitika. For services to the community and health.
- Kathleen Mae Fenton – of Sumner. For services to the community.
- Rowan Gray Edward Garrett – of Paeroa. For services to brass bands.
- Colin Franklin Gibbs – of Wakefield. For services to agriculture and the community.
- Peter John Goodbehere – of Napier. For services to film.
- Joseph Sydney Ronald Robert Hughes – of Ōpōtiki. For services to Fire and Emergency New Zealand and the community.
- Grace Sarina Hutton – of Newlands, Wellington. For services to Pacific art and the community.
- Angela Deirdre Keenan – of Hokitika. For services to sport, particularly netball.
- Arohanui Haumihiata Lawrence – of Hastings. For services to Māori and sustainable food production.
- The Reverend Falkland Gary Fereti Liuvaie – of Porirua. For services to the Niue community.
- Dr Judith Roberta Lowes – of Tauranga. For services to women and roller sports.
- Elizabeth Patricia Norton – of Temuka. For services to the community.
- Stuart Keith Paterson – of Ranfurly. For services to the community.
- James George Powdrill – of Kaikohe. For services to Fire and Emergency New Zealand.
- Neil Lawrence Pugh – of Heathcote Valley. For services to the community.
- Hokikau Kataraina Purcell – of Nawton. For services to seniors and Māori.
- Lasalo Owen Purcell – of Nawton. For services to seniors and Māori.
- Isobel Ransfield – of Ōtaki. For services to Māori.
- Frances Joan Rawling – of Abbotsford. For services to heritage rose preservation.
- Maxwell Thomas Robins – of Epsom. For services to healthcare and seniors.
- Kevin Stechman – of Westport. For services to Fire and Emergency New Zealand.
- The Reverend Alison Jean Stewart – of Marton. For services to choral music.
- Marthalina Mii Taru – of Hataitai. For services to netball and the Pacific community.
- Bruce Herbert Thompson – of Ohakune. For services to Fire and Emergency New Zealand and the community.
- Julia Mary Truesdale – of Wadestown. For services to netball and education.
- Malia Nive Venning – of Trentham. For services to the Tokelau community and netball.
- Theresia Selina Weir – of Matakatia. For services to people with disabilities.
- Janet Mary Wilson – of Ashhurst. For services to wildlife conservation.
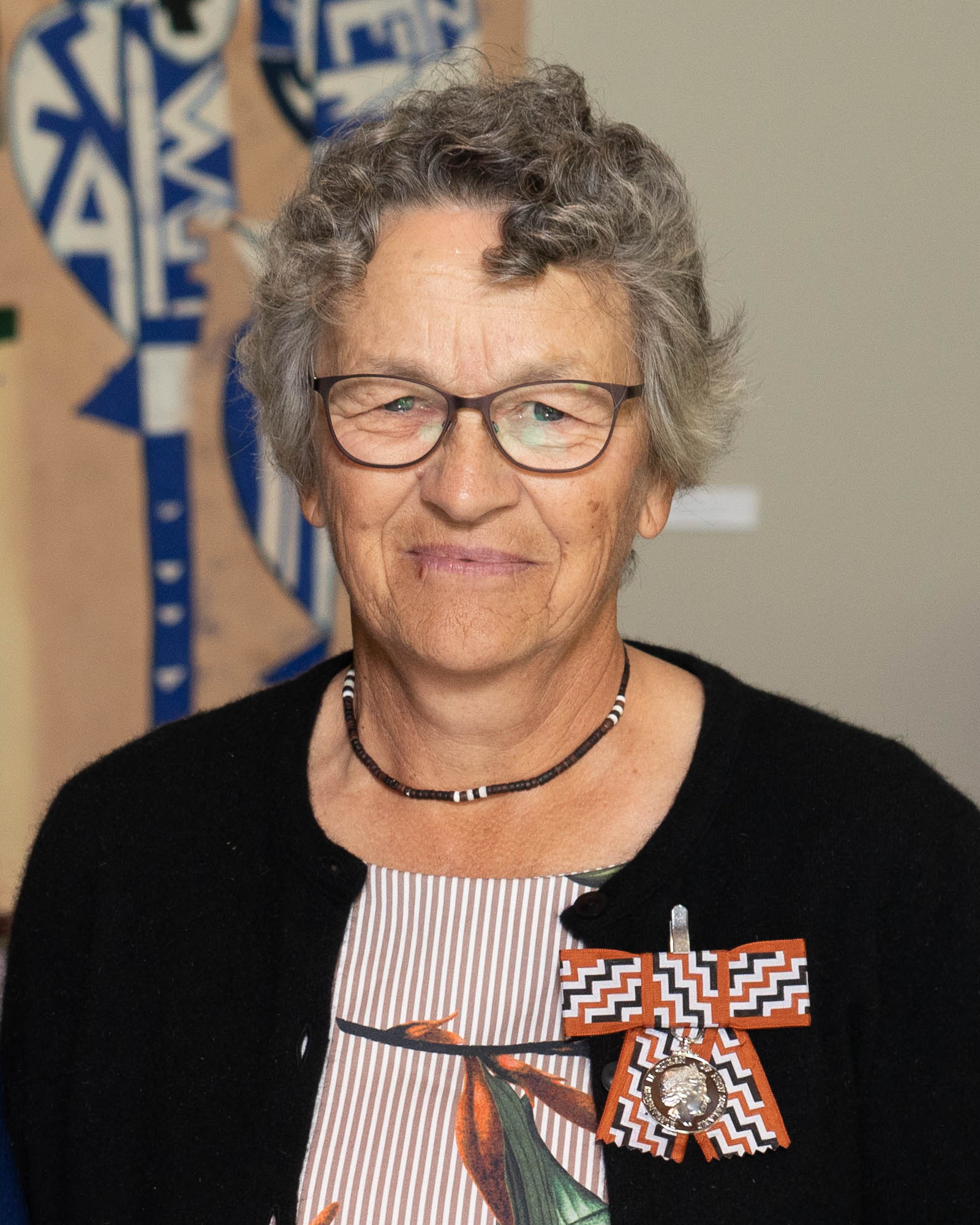
Gill Adshead

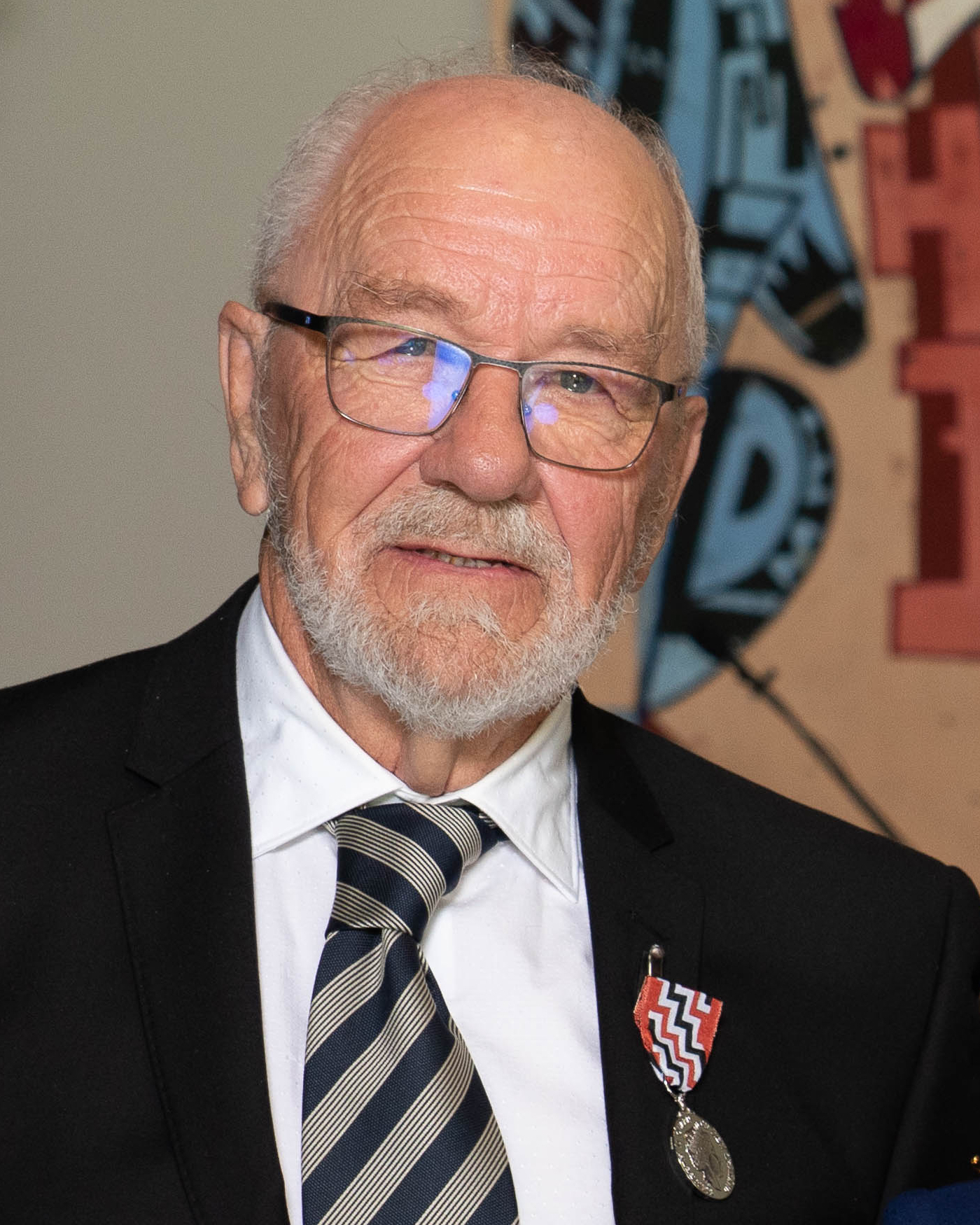
Kevin Adshead

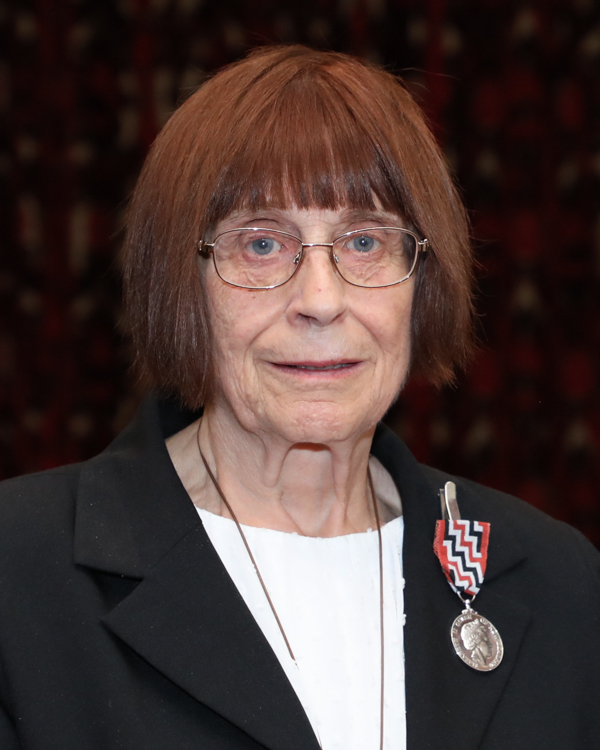
Robin Boldarin

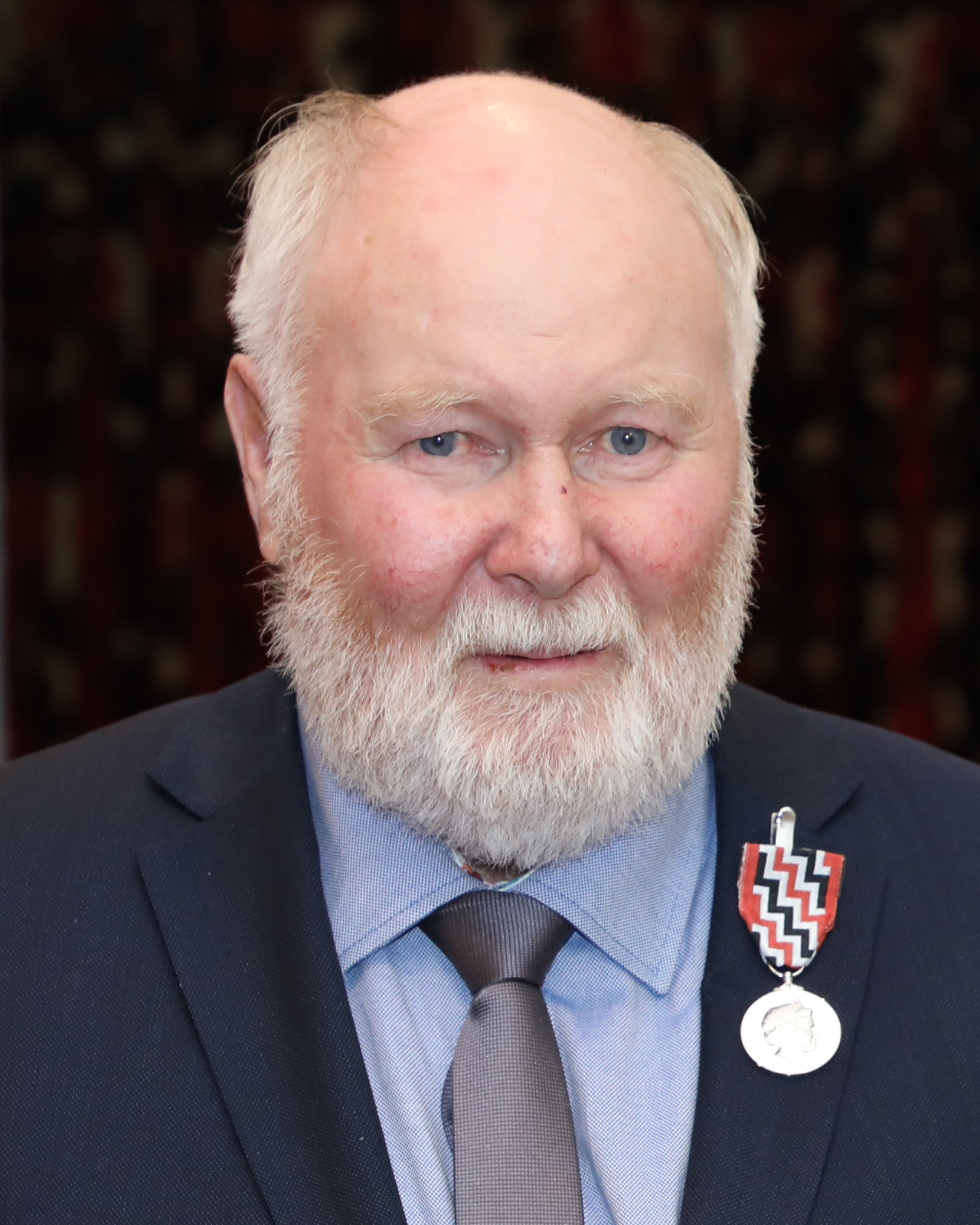
Mike Bourke

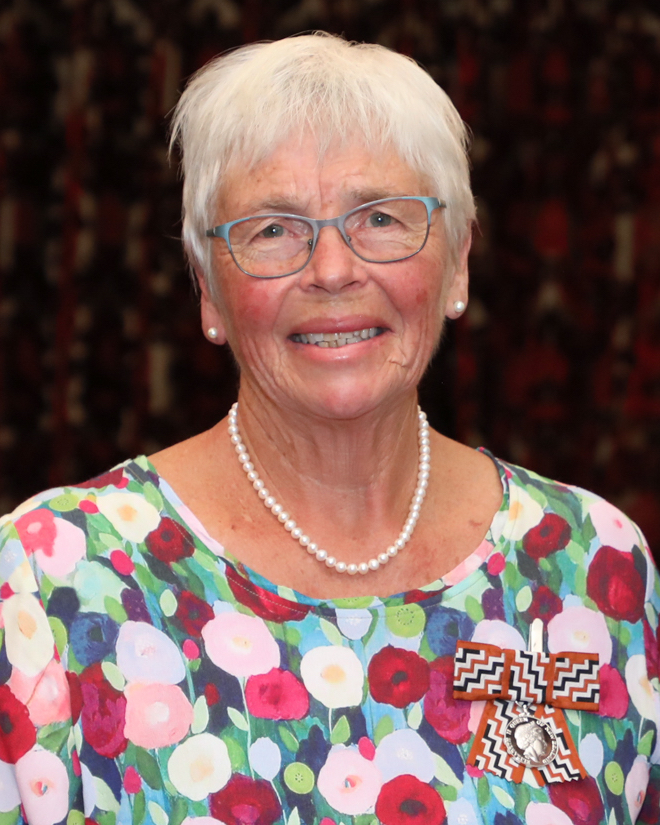
Yvonne Boyes

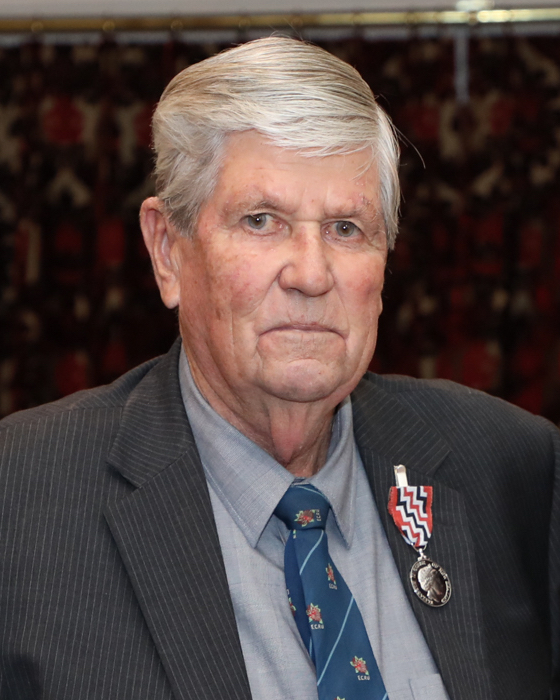
Bill Burdett

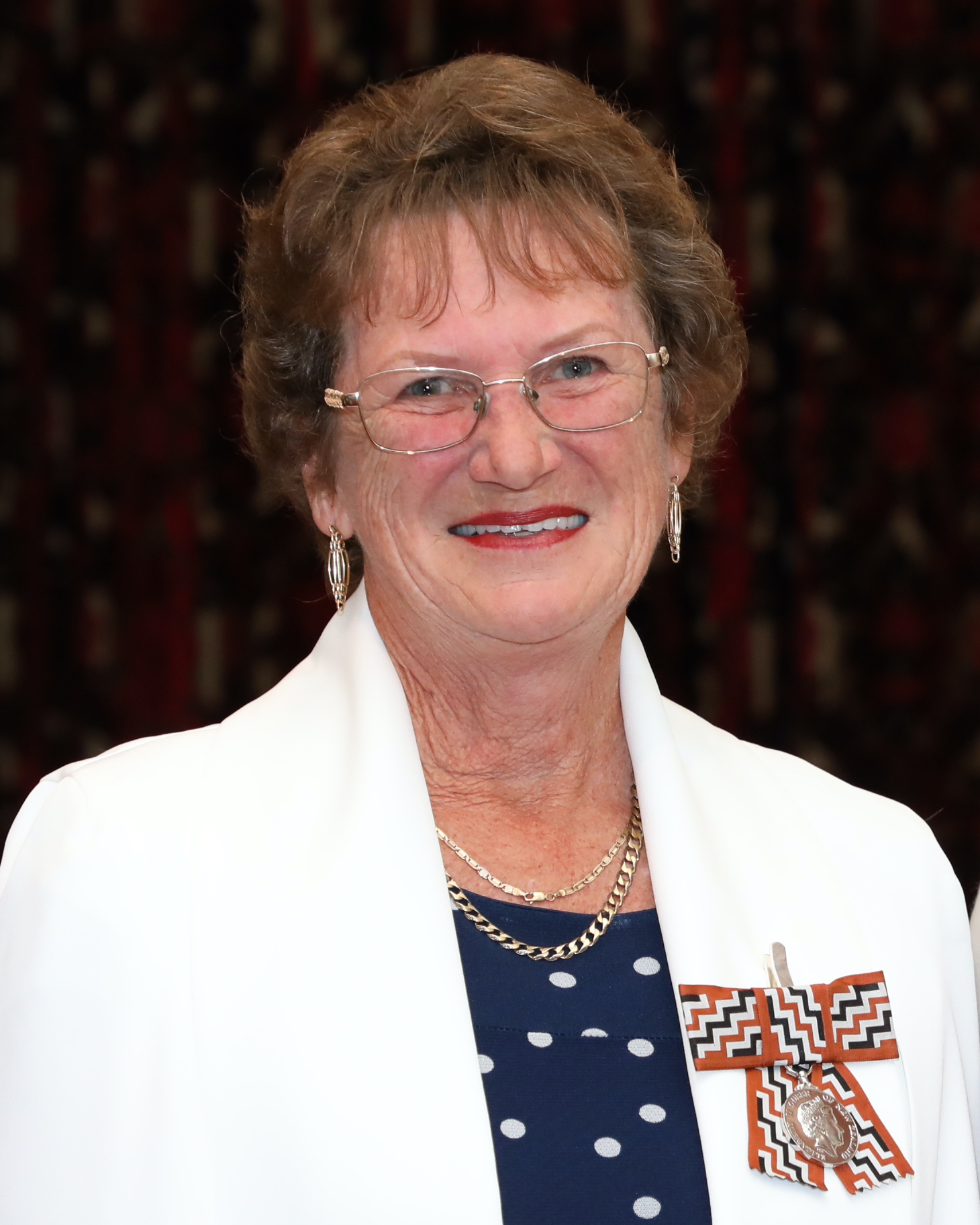
Carol Charman

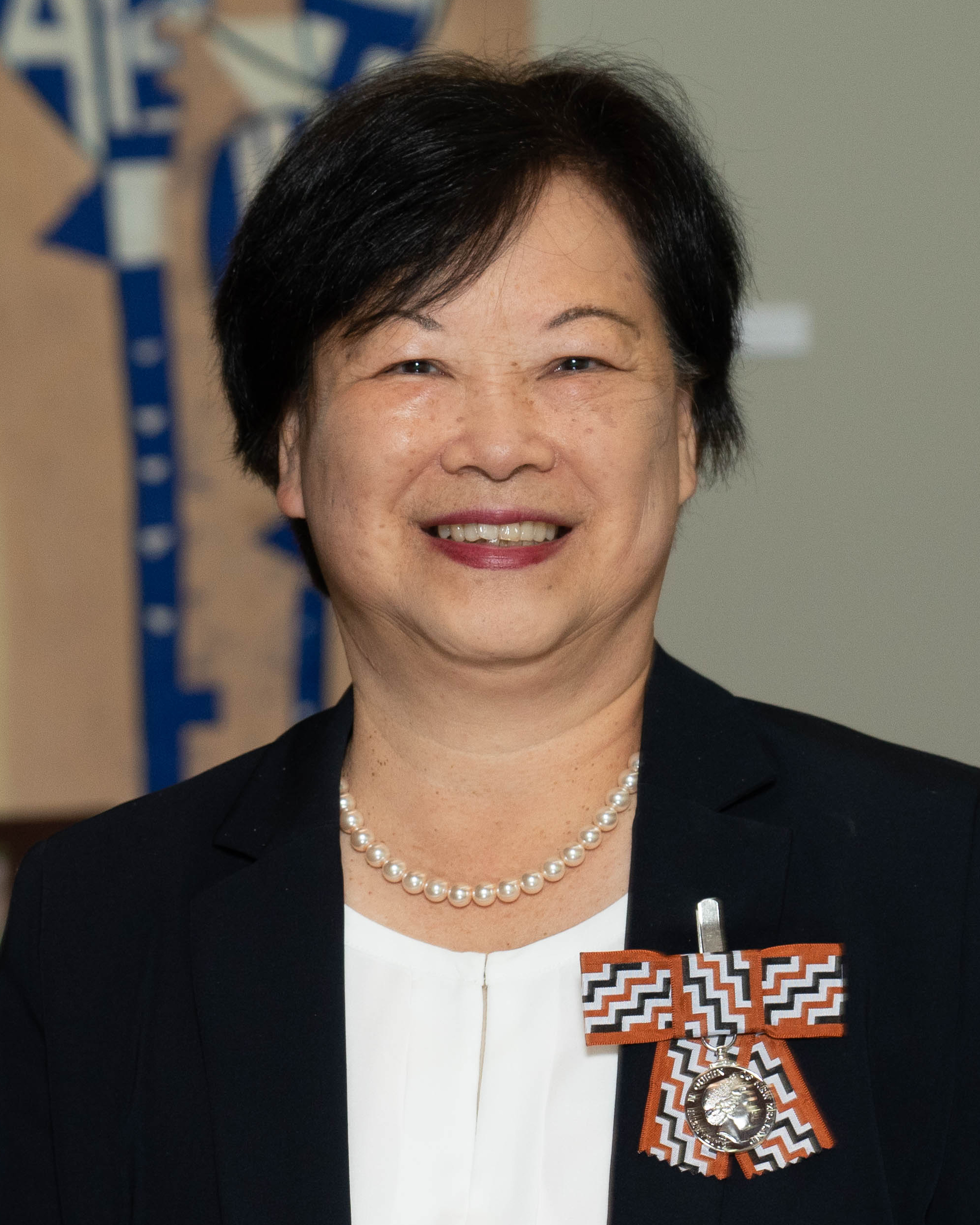
Rosa Chow

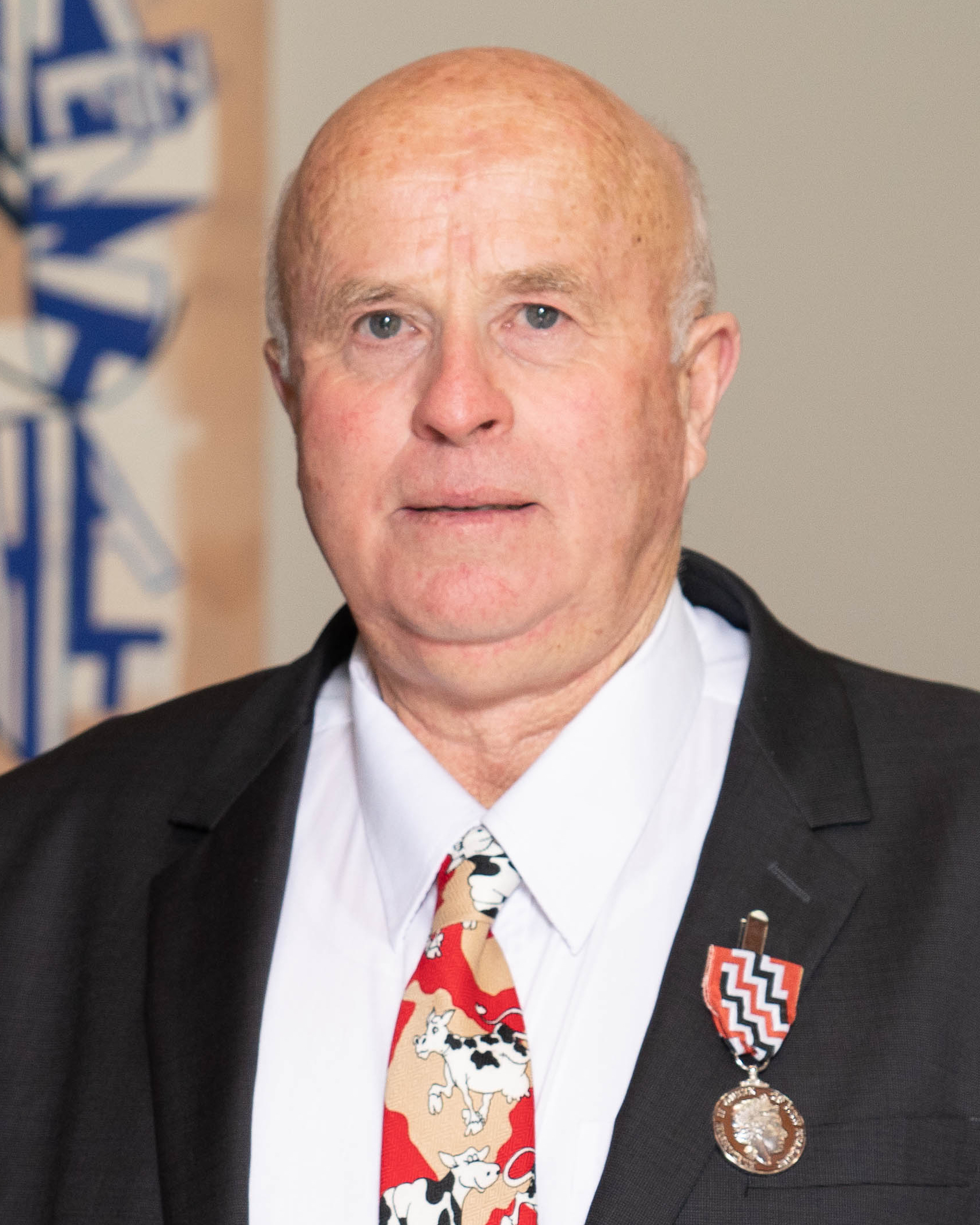
Kerry Clarkin

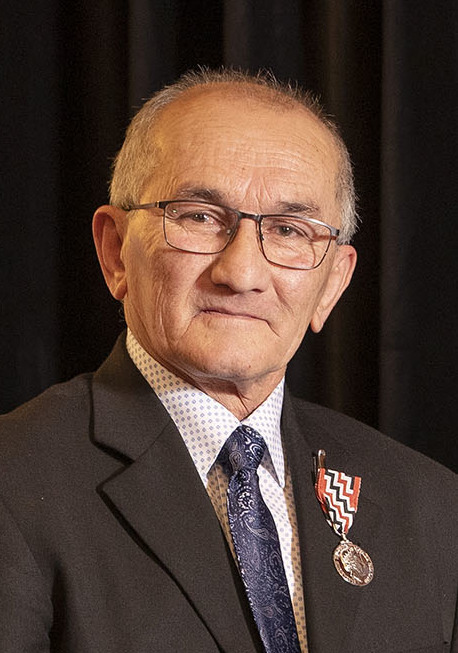
Lester Dean

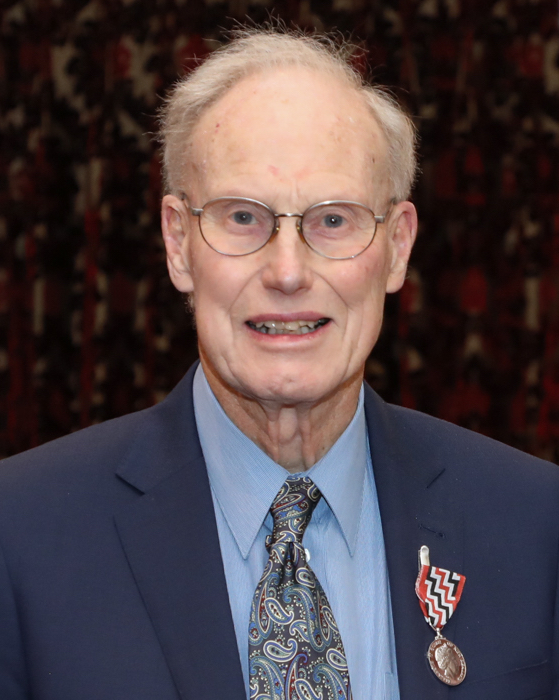
Michael Drake

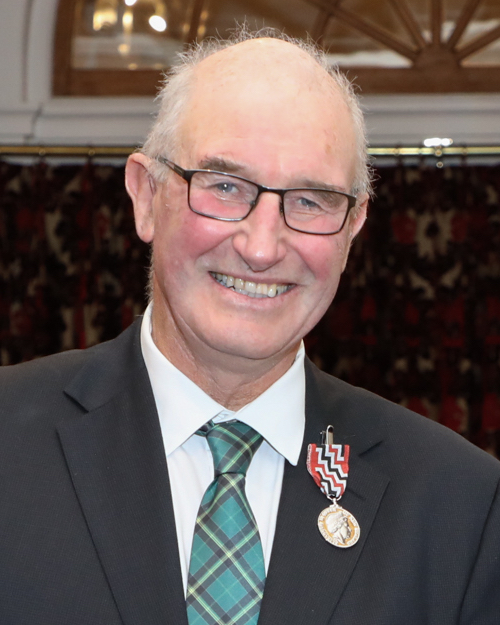
Paul Duffy

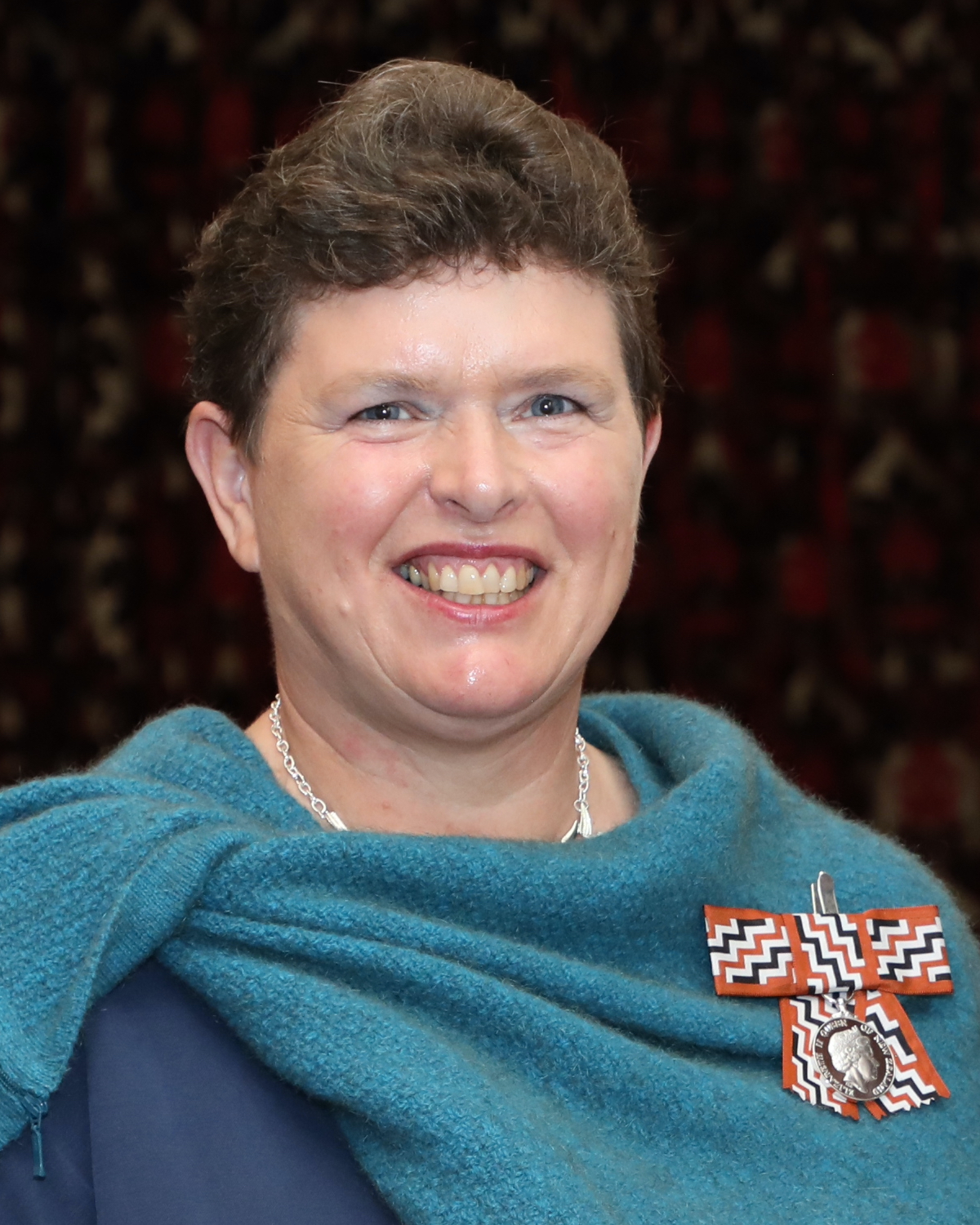
Anna Dyzel

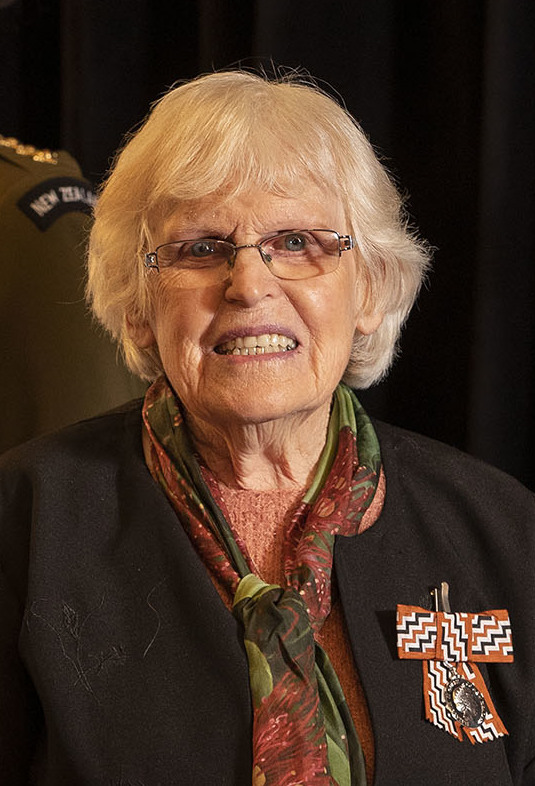
Kitty Fenton

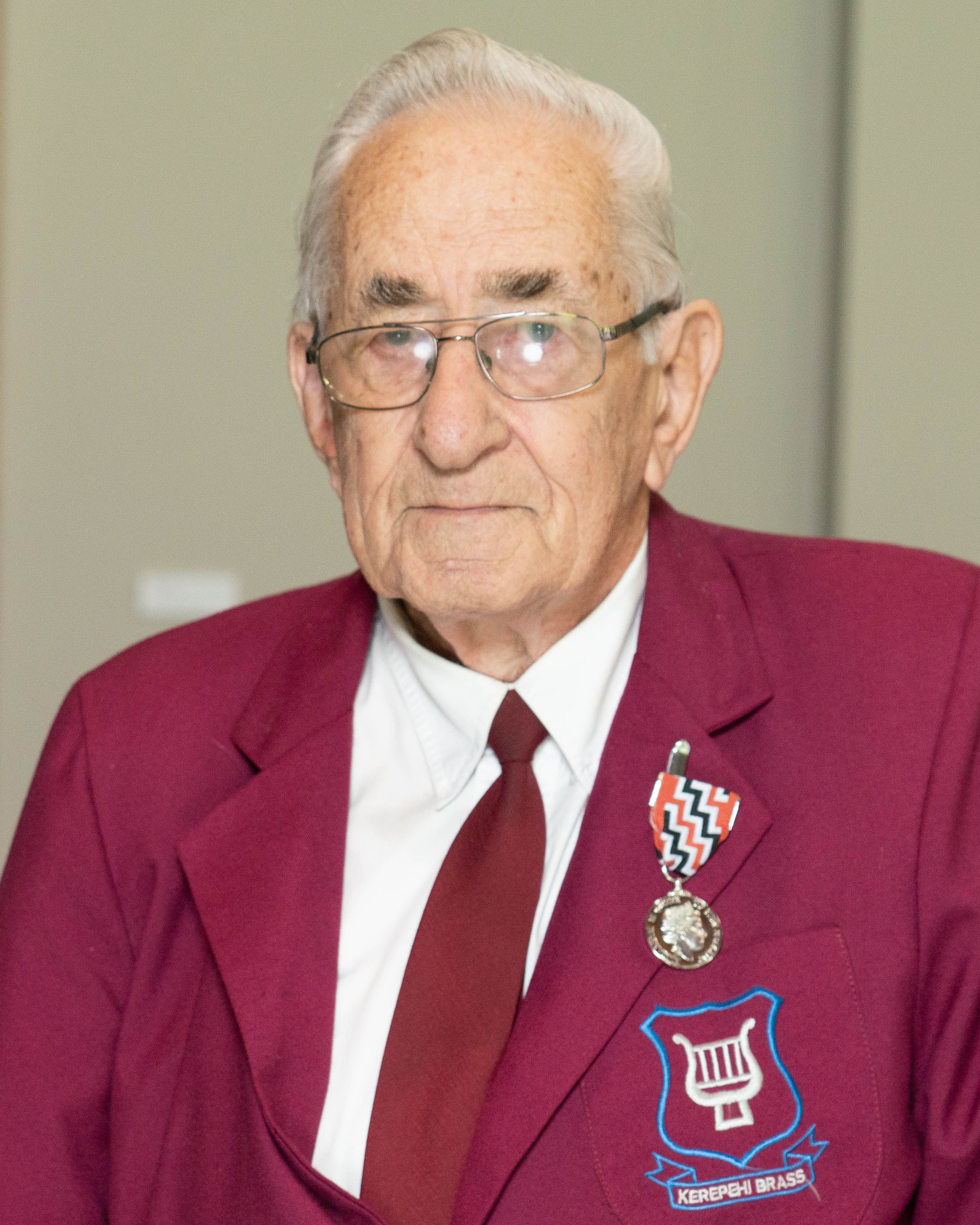
Rowan Garrett

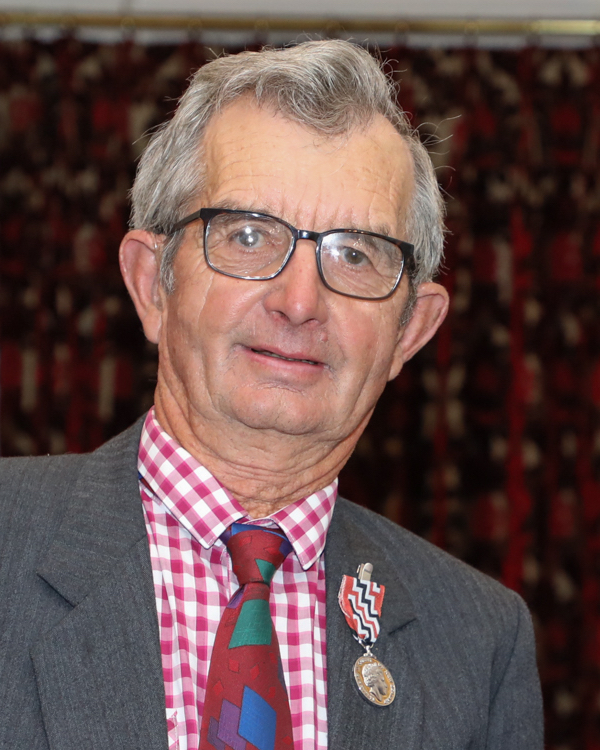
Colin Gibbs

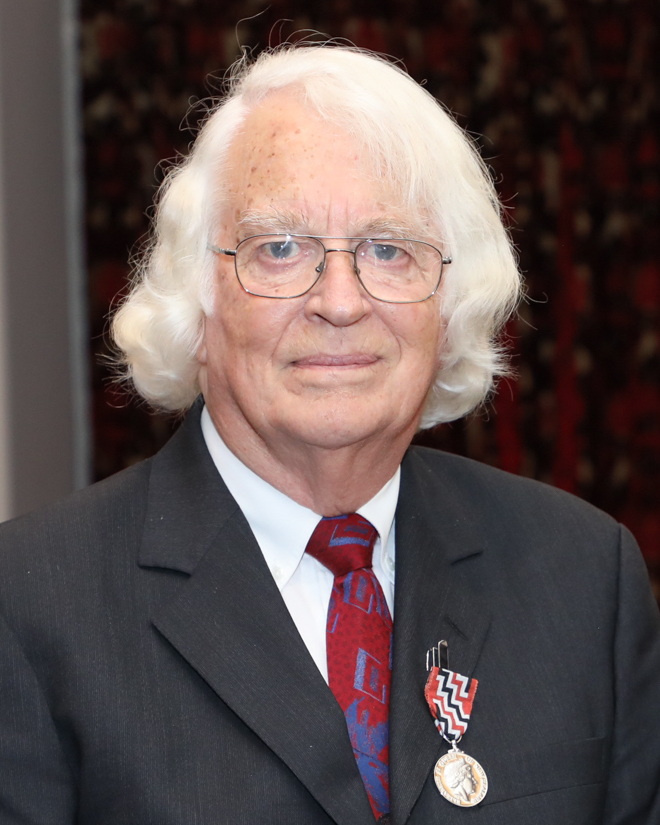
Peter Goodbehere

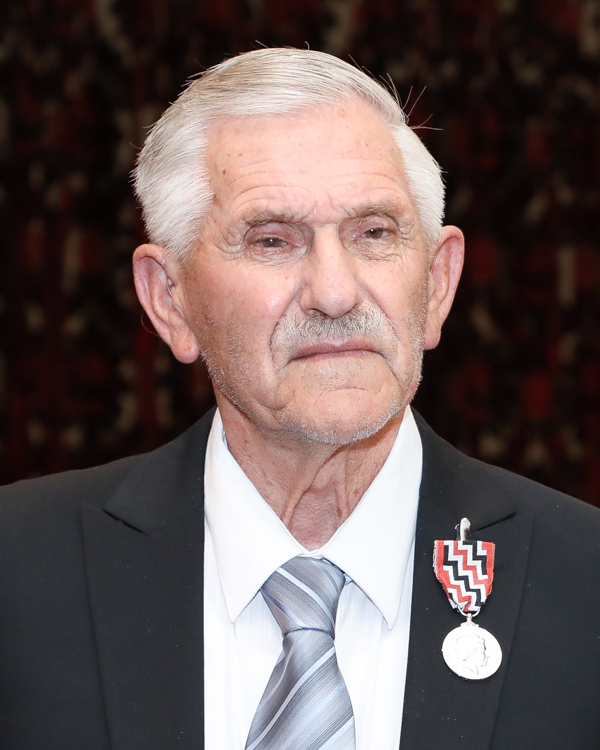
Syd Hughes

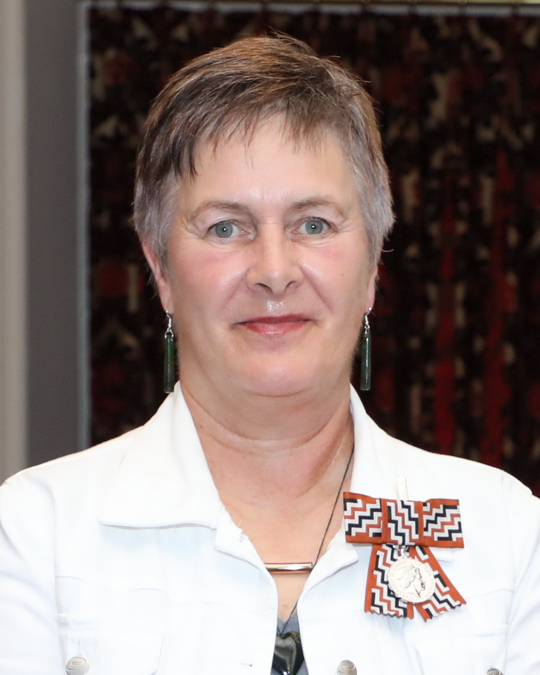
Angela Keenan

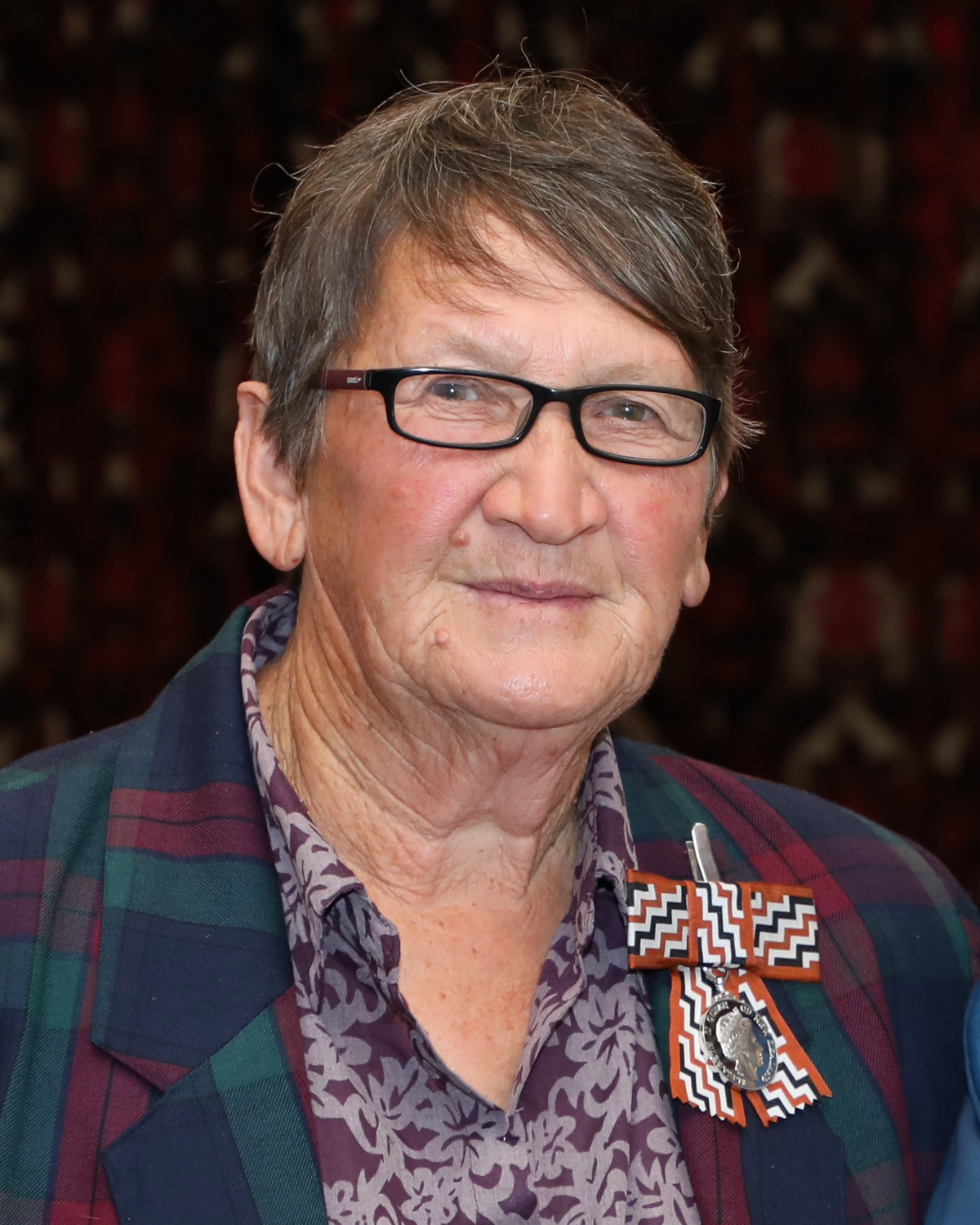
Arohanui Lawrence

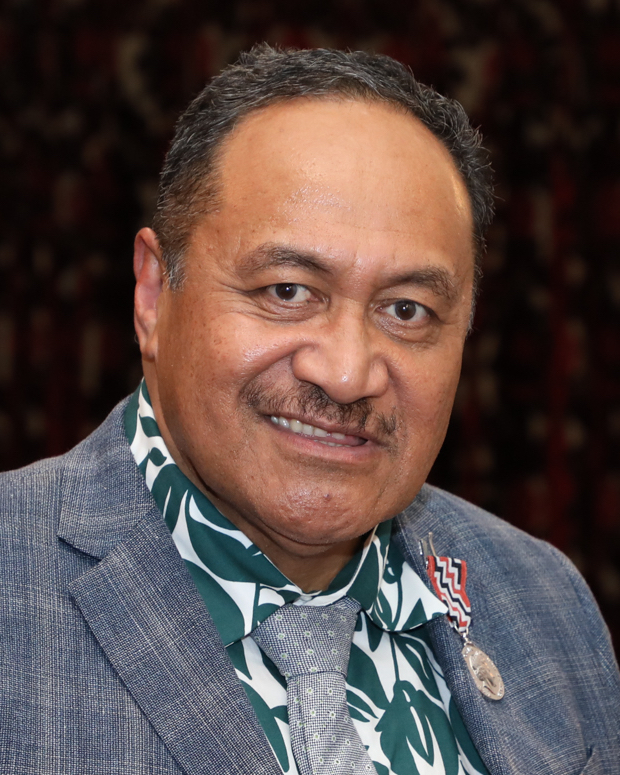
Falkland Liuvaie

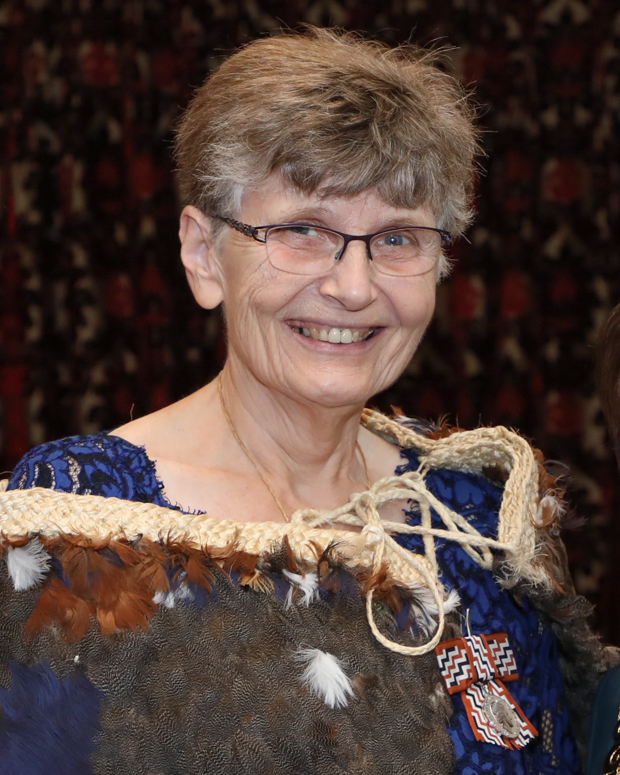
Judith Lowes

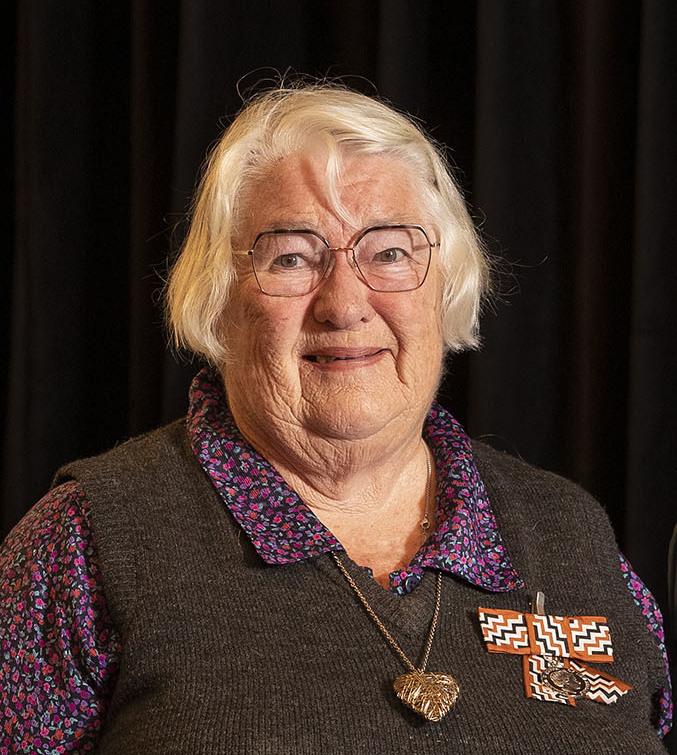
Elizabeth Norton

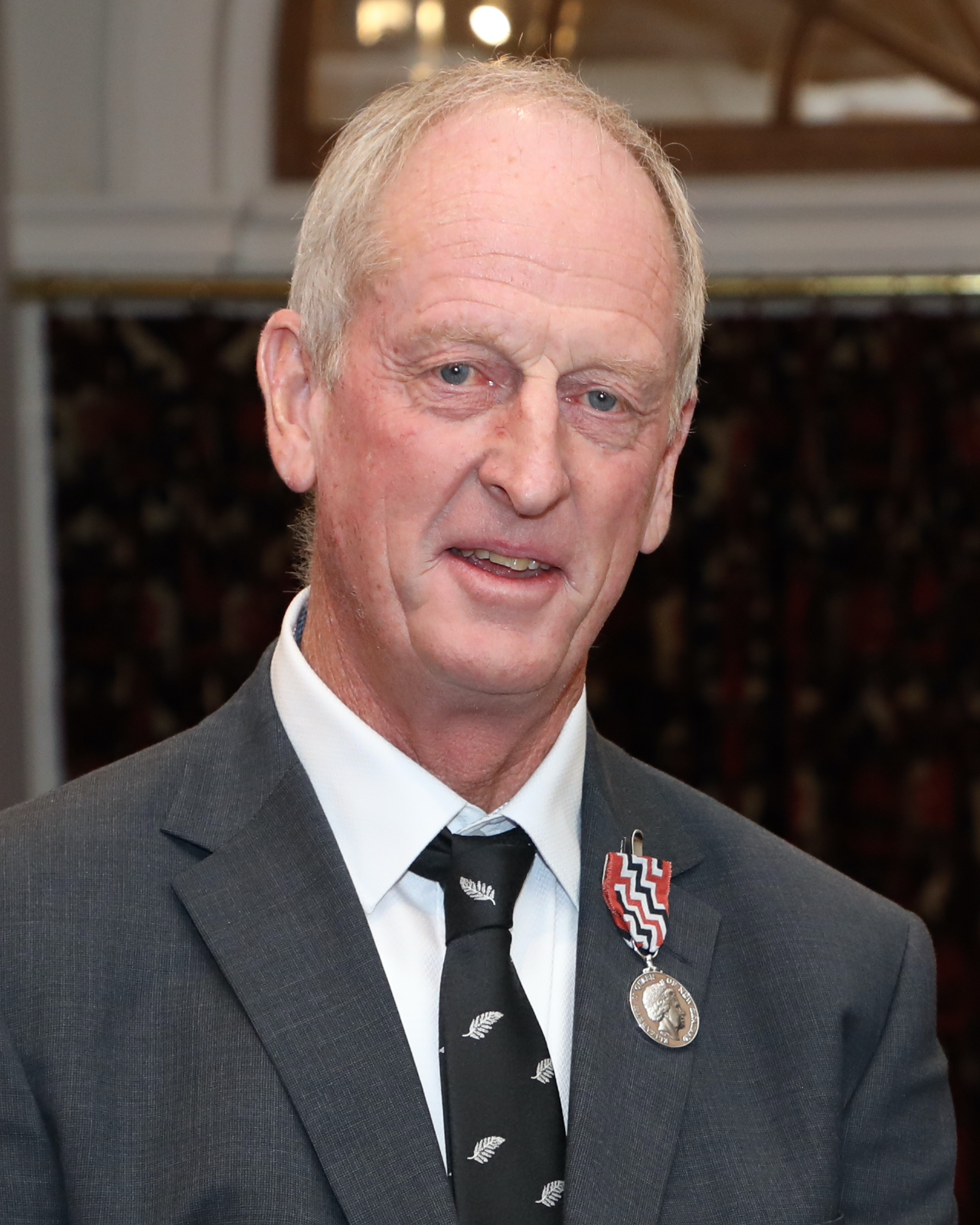
Stuart Paterson

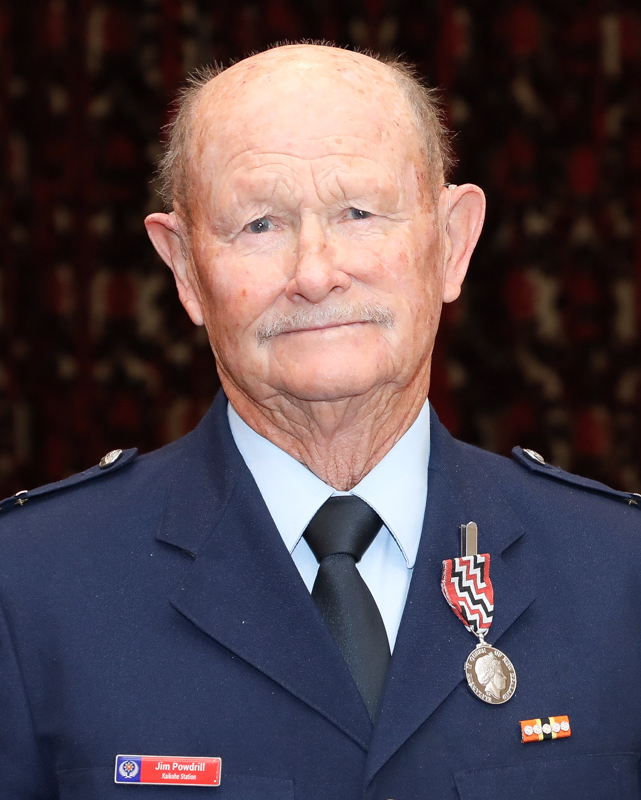
Jim Powdrill

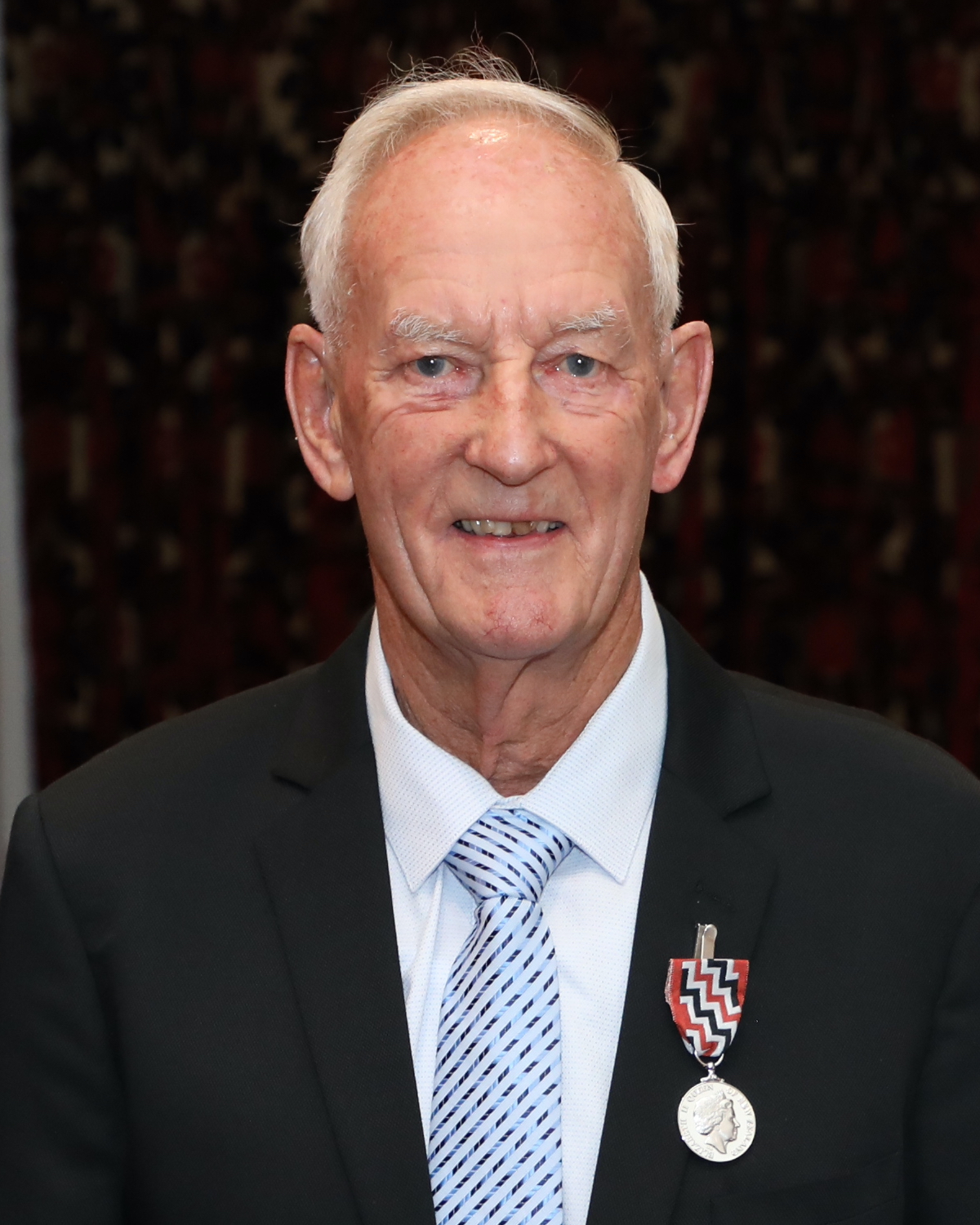
Neil Pugh

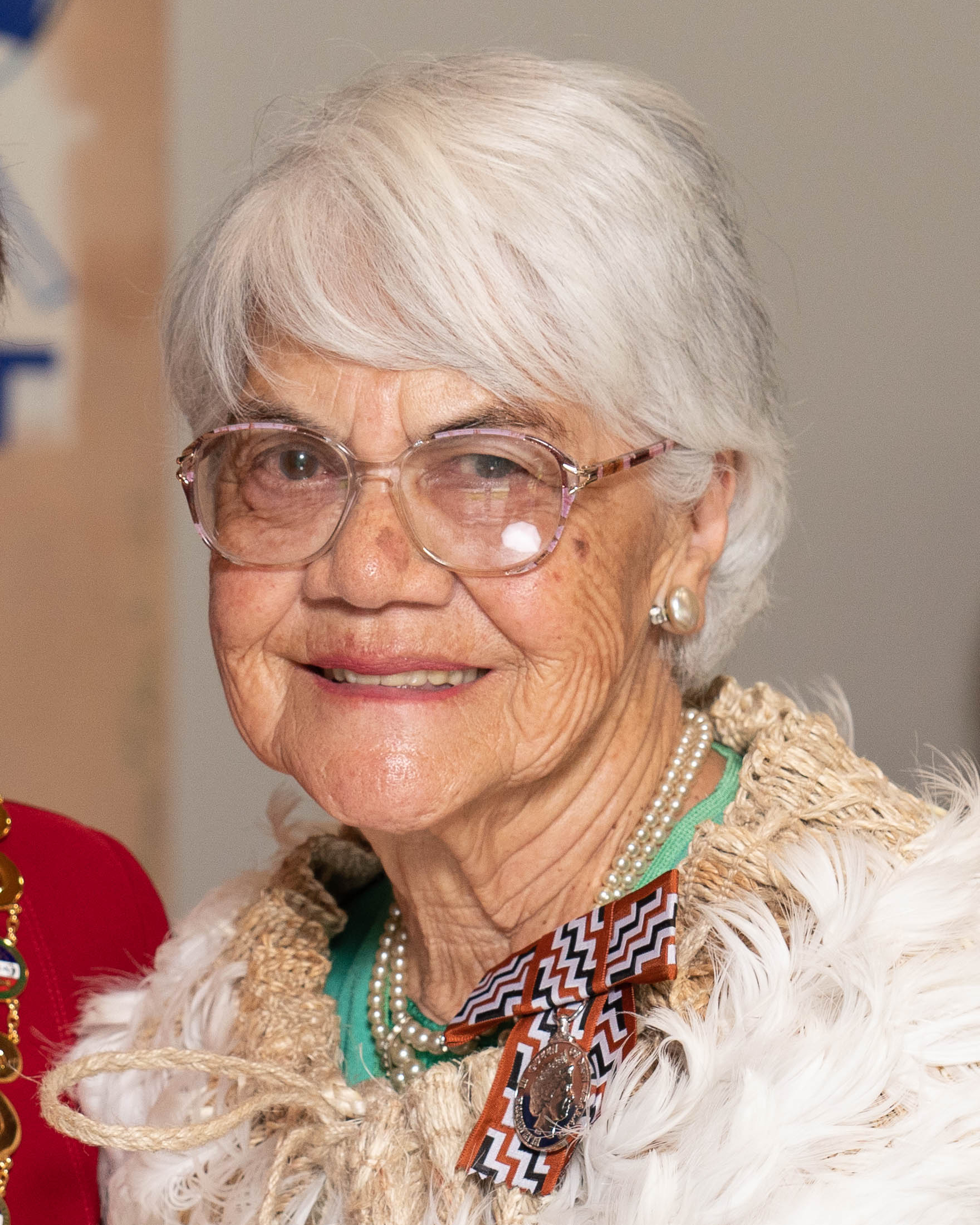
Hoki Purcell

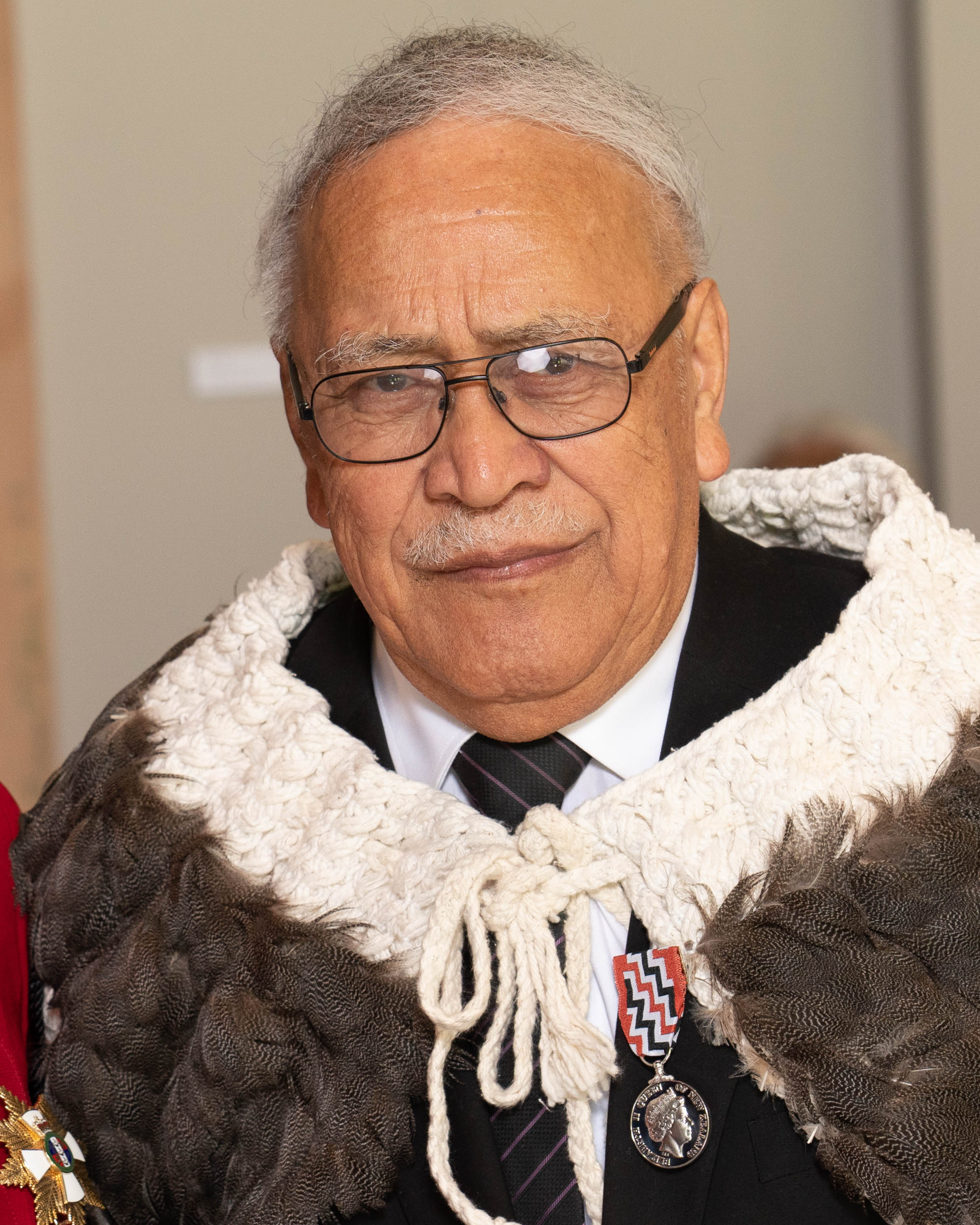
Owen Purcell

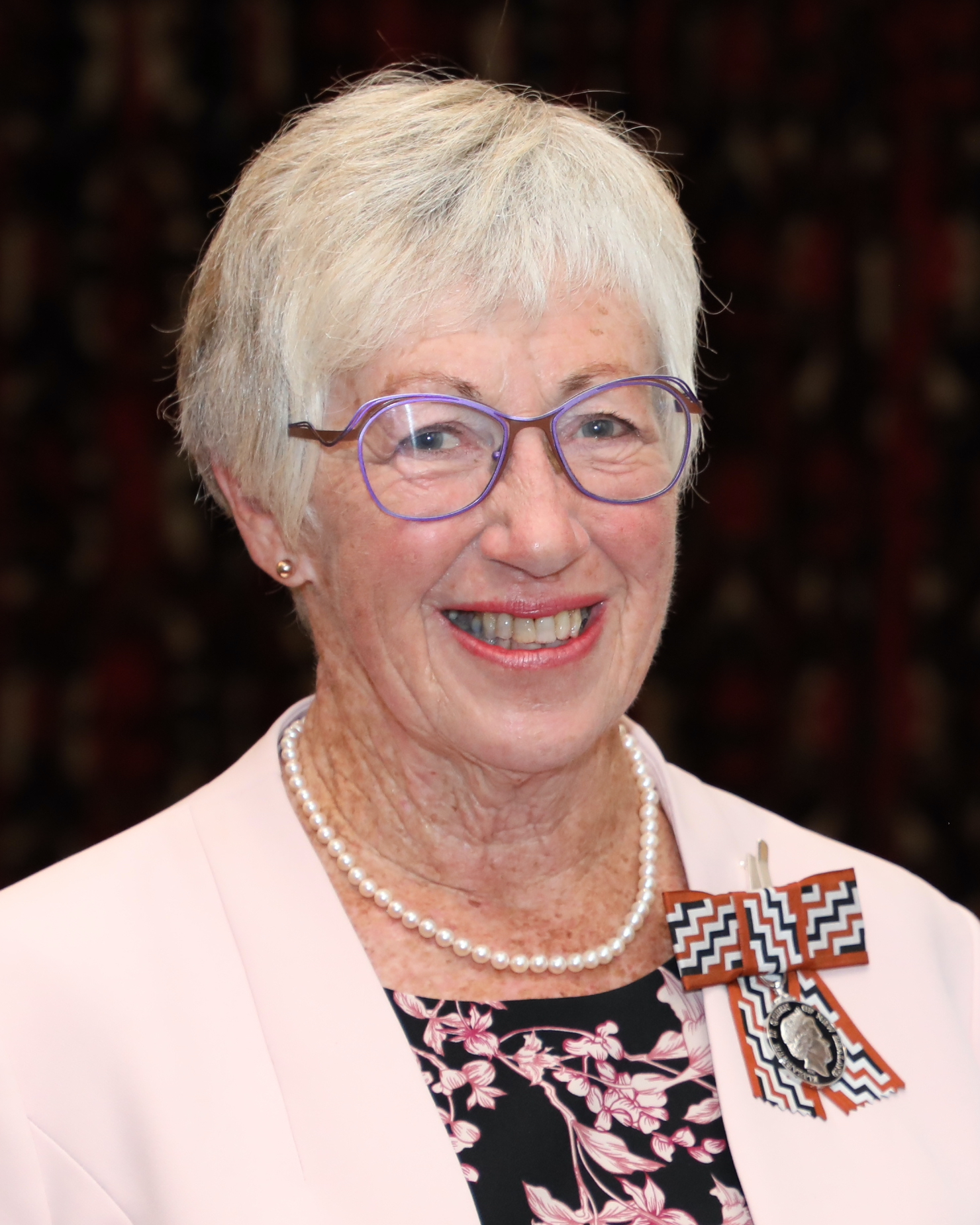
Fran Rawling

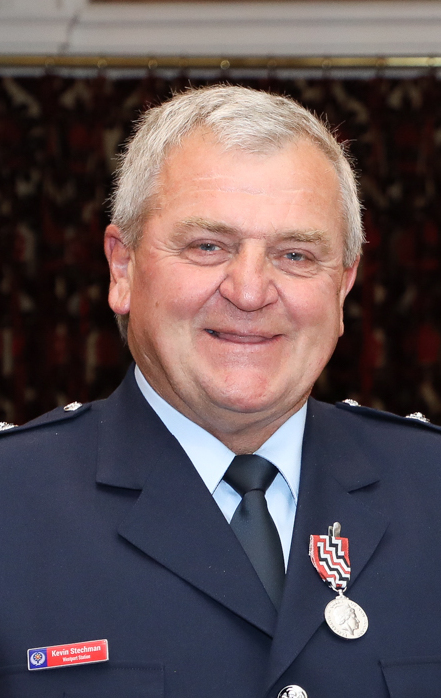
Kevin Stechman

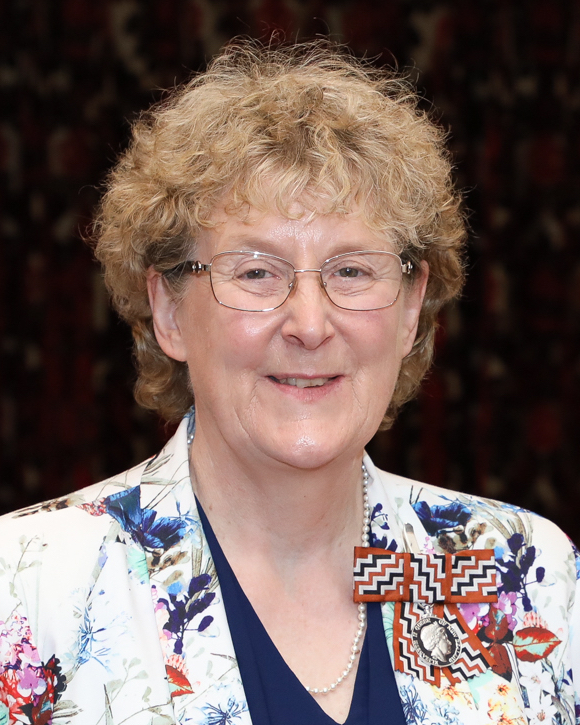
Alison Stewart

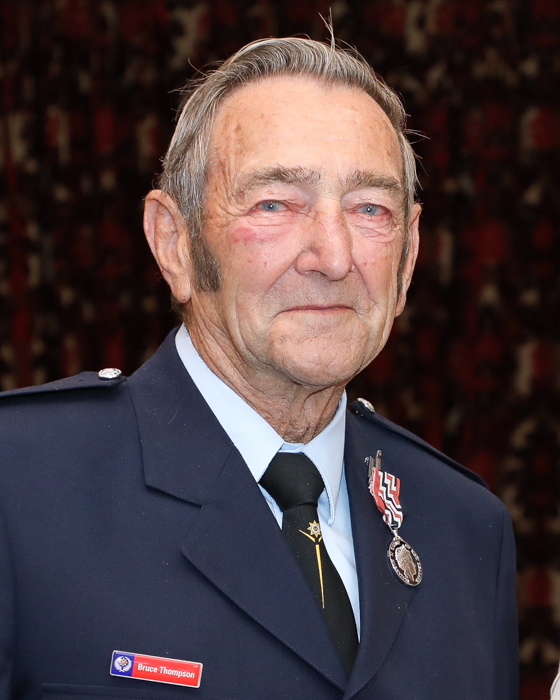
Bruce Thompson

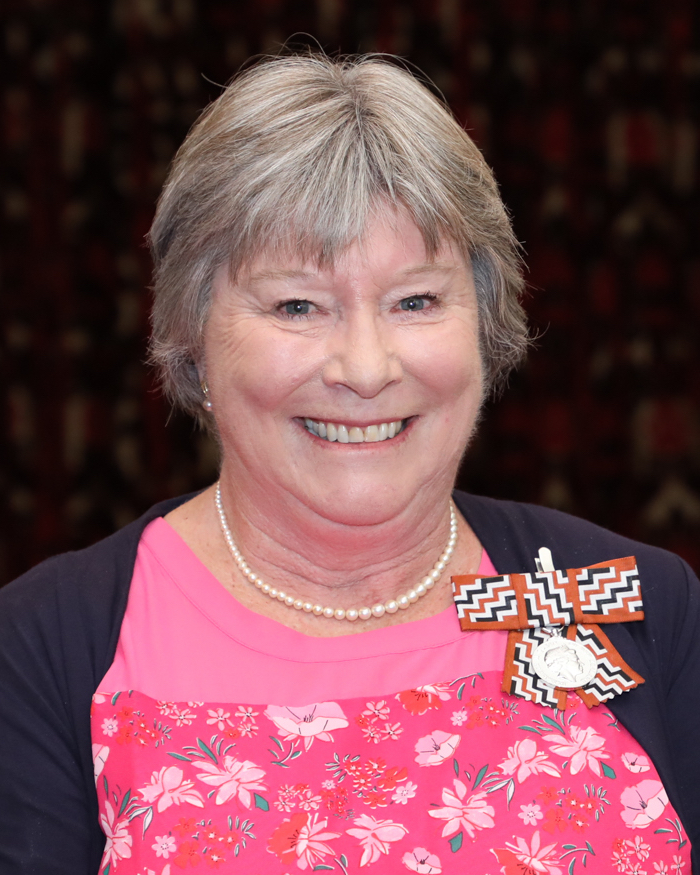
Julia Truesdale

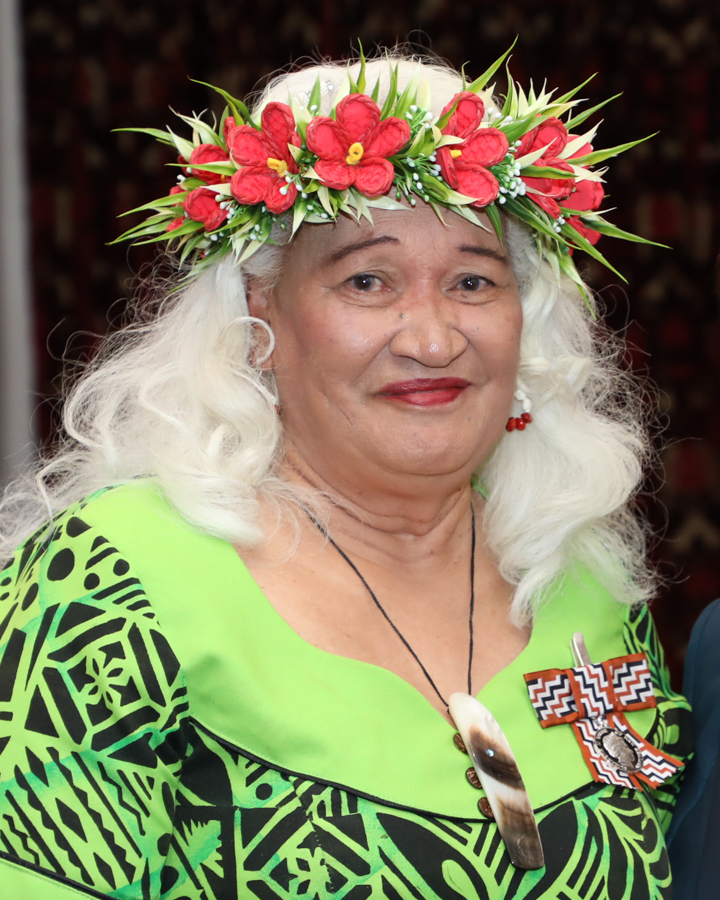
Nive Venning Ahelemo

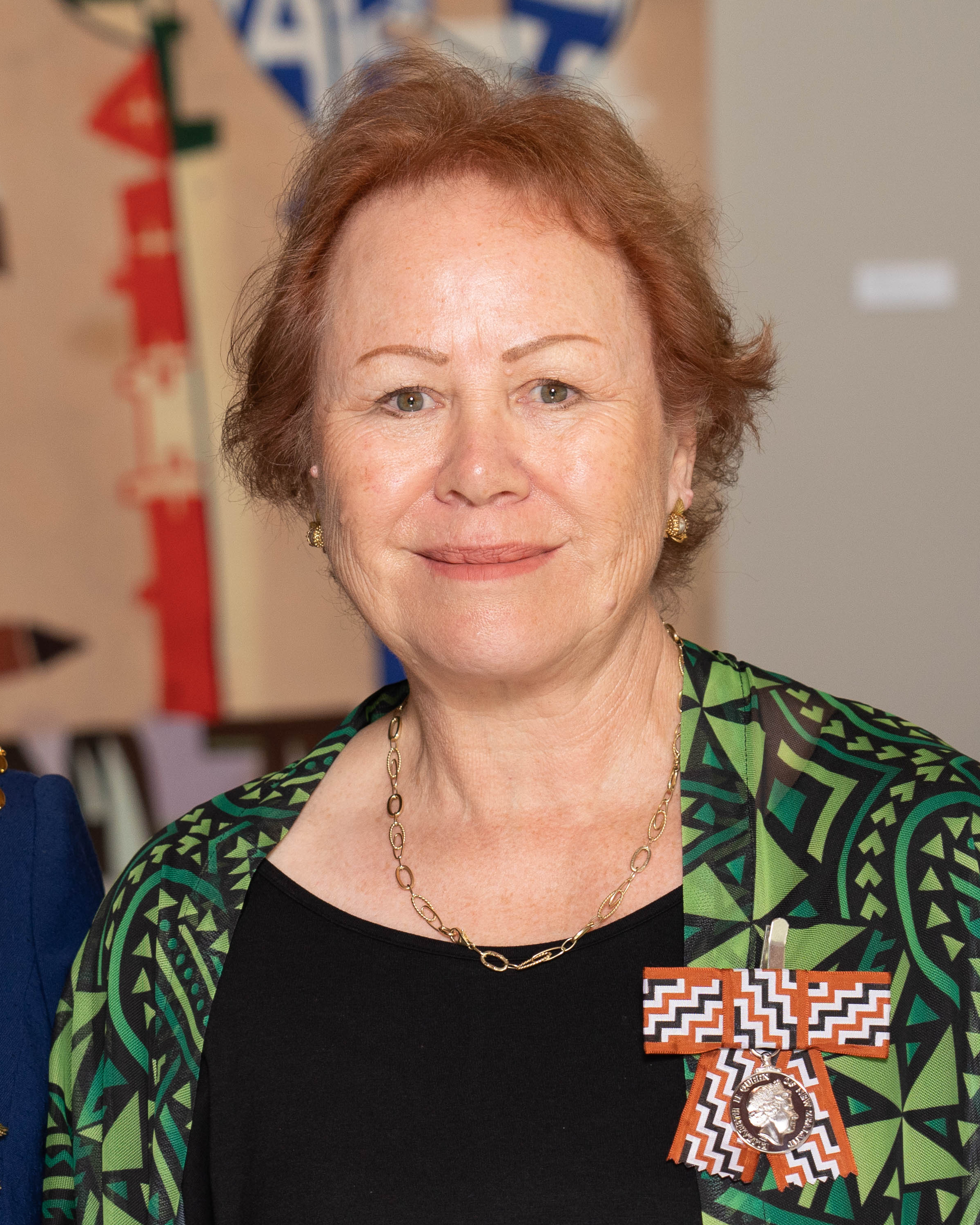
Therese Weir

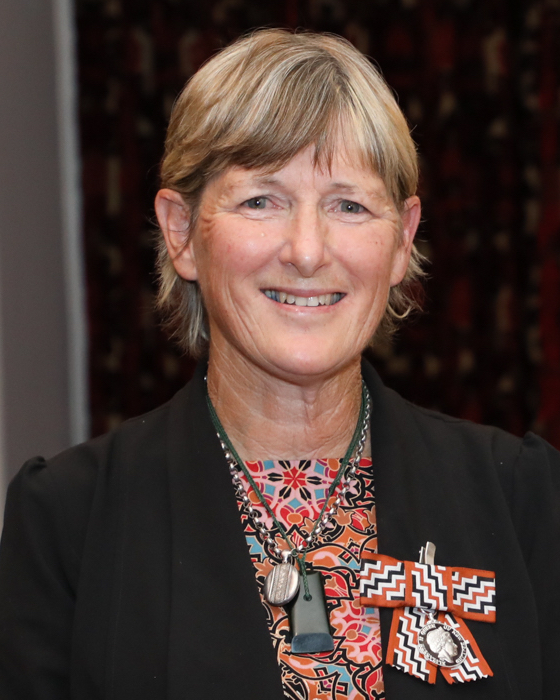
Janet Wilson

== New Zealand Antarctic Medal (NZAM) ==
- Eugene Brian Fitzgerald – of Nelson. For services to Antarctic exploration and heritage.

== New Zealand Distinguished Service Decoration (DSD) ==
- Servicewoman D. For services to the New Zealand Defence Force.
