= Bibliography of New Zealand history =

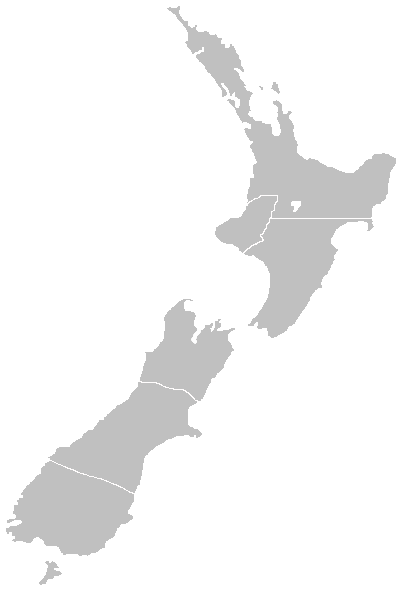
New Zealand

This is a bibliography of selected works on the history of New Zealand.

== General or overview works ==
- Bateman New Zealand Encyclopedia, (6th Edition, 2005)
- Belgrave, Michael (2024). Becoming Aotearoa: A New History of New Zealand. Auckland: Massey University Press. ISBN 978-0-9951318-6-6.
- Belich, James (1996). Making Peoples: a history of the New Zealanders, from Polynesian settlement to the end of the nineteenth century. Honolulu: University of Hawai'i Press. ISBN 978-0824825171.
- Belich, James (2001). Paradise Reforged: a history of the New Zealanders from the 1880s to the year 2000. Auckland: Allen Lane. ISBN 9780713991727.
- Byrnes, Giselle, ed. (2009). The New Oxford History of New Zealand. Oxford University Press. ISBN 978-0-19-558471-4.
- King, Michael (2003). The Penguin History of New Zealand. Auckland: Penguin Group (NZ). ISBN 978-1-7422-8826-0.
- Mein Smith, Philippa (2012). A Concise History of New Zealand (Second ed.). Cambridge: Cambridge University Press. ISBN 9781139196574.
- Oliver, W.H. ed. The Oxford History of New Zealand (Oxford University Press, 1981), 16 chapters by experts
- Sinclair, Keith (1988). A History of New Zealand (Rev. ed.). Auckland: Penguin. ISBN 9780140228212.
- Sinclair, Keith, ed. (1997). The Oxford Illustrated History of New Zealand (2nd ed.). Auckland: Oxford University Press. ISBN 9780195583816.
- Walker, Ranginui (2004). Ka Whawhai Tonu Matou = Struggle Without End. Auckland: Penguin Books. ISBN 9780143019459.

== Arts and literature ==
- Tony Ballantyne, "Placing Literary Culture: Books and Civic Culture in Milton" in Journal of New Zealand Literature (2010)
- Beavan, Peter, and John Stacpoole. New Zealand Art and Architecture, 1820–1970 (1973)
- David Eggleton. Towards Aotearoa: A Short History of 20th Century New Zealand Art (2007)
- Evans, Patrick. The Penguin History of New Zealand Literature (Auckland: Penguin, 1990)
- Feeney, Warren. "The Establishment of the Canterbury Society of Arts: Forming the Taste, Judgement and Identity of a Province, 1850–1880," New Zealand Journal of History (2010) 44#2 pp 174–189. Explores the influence of British art, the links of the CSA to the Royal Academy in London, the role of Enlightenment ideals of liberalism and individualism, how imperial nationmalism influence art and helped form a New Zealand identity, and establishment of the Canterbury College School of Art.
- McCormick, E. H. Letters and art in New Zealand (1940)
- Murray, Stuart. Never a Soul at Home: New Zealand Literary Nationalism and the 1930s (Wellington: Victoria University Press, 1998)
- Pound, Francis. The Invention of New Zealand: Art and National Identity, 1930–1970 (2009)
- Robinson, Roger, and Nelson Wattie, eds. The Oxford Companion to New Zealand Literature (Melbourne: Oxford University Press, 1998)
- Sturm, Terry, ed. The Oxford History of New Zealand Literature in English (Auckland: Oxford University Press, 1991)
- Williams, Mark, and Michele Leggott, eds. Opening the Book: New Essays on New Zealand Writing (Auckland University Press, 1995)

== Economics ==
- Banner, Stuart. "Conquest by Contract: Wealth Transfer and Land Market Structure in Colonial New Zealand," Law & Society Review (2000) 34#1 pp. 47–96 in JSTOR
- Belshaw, H. "Dairying Industry of New Zealand," Economic Geography (1927) 3#3 pp. 281–296 in JSTOR
- Belshaw, H. "Crisis and Readjustment in New Zealand," Journal of Political Economy (1933) 41#6 pp. 750–775 in JSTOR, covers economic impact of the Great Depression
- Buchanan, R. Ogilvie. "Sheep Rearing in New Zealand," Economic Geography (1931) 7#4 pp. 365–379 in JSTOR
- Condliffe, J. B. New Zealand in the Making: A Study of Economic and Social Development (2nd ed. 1959) online, an influential survey
- Hawke, Gary R. The Making of New Zealand: An Economic History (1985) excerpt and text search, a standard textbook
- Hawke, Gary R., and Richard W. Baker. Anzus Economics: Economic Trends and Relations among Australia, New Zealand, and the United States (Praeger Publishers, 1992)
- Hawke, G. R. "The Government and the Depression of the 1930s in New Zealand: An Essay Towards a Revision," Australian Economic History Review (1973) 13#1, pp 72–95
- Hunter, Ian and Marie Wilson. "Origins and Opportunity: 150 Years of New Zealand Entrepreneurship," Journal of Management and Organization (2007) 13#4
- Le Rossignol, James Edward, and William Downie Stewart. "Railways in New Zealand," Quarterly Journal of Economics (1909) 23#4 pp. 652–696 in JSTOR, free
- Lloyd-Prichard, Muriel Florence. An economic history of New Zealand to 1939 (1970)
- McLauchlan, Gordon. The Farming of New Zealand: The People and the Land (2006)
- Riseborough, Hazel. Shear Hard Work: A History of New Zealand Shearing (2009)
- Stewart, William Downie. "Land Tenure and Land Monopoly in New Zealand: I," Journal of Political Economy (1909) 17#2 pp. 82–91, 144–52 in JSTOR

== Environment and geography ==
- Brooking, Tom, and Eric Pawson. Environmental Histories of New Zealand (2002)
- Brooking, Tom, and Eric Pawson. Seeds of Empire: The Environmental Transformation of New Zealand (2010)
- Craig, John, et al. "Conservation issues in New Zealand." Annual Review of ecology and Systematics 31.1 (2000): 61-78. online
- Dunlap, Thomas R. Nature and the English Diaspora: Environment and History in the United States, Canada, Australia, and New Zealand (1999)
- Galbreath, Ross. Working for wildlife: a history of the New Zealand Wildlife Service (Wellington: Bridget Williams, 1993).
- Grey, Alan H. Aotearoa & New Zealand: A Historical Geography (Canterbury University Press 1994)
- Hamer D.A. "Towns in Nineteenth-Century New Zealand," New Zealand Journal of History (1979) 13#1 pp 5–24.
- Hamer, David. "The making of urban New Zealand," Journal of Urban History (1995) 22#1 pp 6–39
- Hayward, Bruce W. Precious land: protecting New Zealand’s landforms and geological features (Lower Hutt: Geological Society of New Zealand, 1996).
- McKinnon, Malcolm. Bateman New Zealand historical atlas (1997)
- Nathan, Simon. "Conservation – a history" The Encyclopedia of New Zealand. (2025) online
- Nightingale, Tony; Dingwall, Paul (October 2003). Our Picturesque Heritage: 100 years of scenery preservation in New Zealand (PDF). Department of Conservation. ISBN 0-478-22491-5.
- Park, Geoff. Ngā Uruora / The Groves of Life: Ecology and History in a New Zealand Landscape (Wellington, Victoria University Press, 1995)
- Pawson, E. and Brooking, T., eds. Environmental histories of New Zealand, (Oxford University Press, Melbourne) pp. 266–269.
- Peat, N. Manapouri. Saved, New Zealand's First Great Conservation Success Story (Dunedin, 1994)
- Saunders, A., and D. A. Norton. "Ecological restoration at mainland islands in New Zealand." Biological Conservation 99.1 (2001): 109-119.
- Smith, Ian T., Rowan Taylor. The State of New Zealand's Environment, 1997 (1997) online
- Stewart‐Harawira, Makere W. "Troubled waters: Maori values and ethics for freshwater management and New Zealand's fresh water crisis." Wiley Interdisciplinary Reviews: Water 7.5 (2020): e1464. online
- Tobias, Michael Charles; Morrison, Jane Gray (2011). God's Country: The New Zealand Factor. Ithaca, New York: Zorba Press. ISBN 978-0-927379-99-1. Archived from the original on 5 March 2012.
- Walker, Susan; Price, Robbie; Rutledge, Daniel (May 2008). New Zealand's remaining indigenous cover: recent changes and biodiversity protection needs (PDF). Science for conservation 284. Wellington: Department of Conservation. ISBN 978-0-478-14403-1.
- Wilson, Roger. From Manapouri to Aramoana: the battle for New Zealand’s environment (Auckland: Earthworks, 1982).
- Young, David (2004). Our Islands, Our Selves. Dunedin: University of Otago Press. ISBN 1-877276-94-4.
- "The value of conservation: Benefits of conservation". Wellington, N.Z.: New Zealand Department of Conservation. October 2006.

== Foreign affairs and wars ==
- Belich, James. The New Zealand Wars and the Victorian Interpretation of Racial Conflict (1989)
- Buchanan, Paul G. "Lilliputian in Fluid Times: New Zealand Foreign Policy after the Cold War," Political Science Quarterly (2010) 125#2 pp 255–279
- Hensley, Gerald, Beyond the Battlefield: New Zealand and its Allies, 1939–45 (2009) 415pp., diplomatic history
- McGibbon, Ian, and Paul Goldstone. The Oxford Companion to New Zealand Military History (2001)
- McKinnon, Malcolm. Independence and Foreign Policy: New Zealand in the World since 1935 (Auckland University Press 1993)
- Patman, Robert G., et al. eds. New Zealand and the world : past, present and future (World Scientific, 2018) ISBN 9789813232396
- Stack, Wayne, et al. "The New Zealand Expeditionary Force in World War II" (Osprey, 2013), Illustrated.

== Government and reform ==
- Coleman, Peter J. "The Spirit of New Zealand Liberalism in the Nineteenth Century," Journal of Modern History (1958) 30#3 pp. 227–235 in JSTOR
- Coleman, Peter J. "New Zealand Liberalism and the Origins of the American Welfare State," Journal of American History (1982) 69#2 pp. 372–391 in JSTOR
- Coleman, Peter J. Progressivism and the World of Reform: New Zealand and the Origins of the American Welfare State (1987)
- Davidson, Alexander. Two Models of Welfare: The Origins and Development of the Welfare State in Sweden and New Zealand, 1888–1988 (1989)
- Fischer, David Hackett. Fairness and Freedom: A History of Two Open Societies: New Zealand and the United States (2012) a search for fairness infuses N.Z. politics, compared to freedom in the US excerpt and text search
- Grimshaw, Patricia. Women's Suffrage in New Zealand (1988), the standard scholarly study
- Grimshaw, Patricia. "Women's Suffrage in New Zealand Revisited: Writing from the Margins," Caroline Daley, and Melanie Nolan, eds. Suffrage and Beyond: International Feminist Perspectives (New York U.P., 1994) pp 25–41.

== Labour ==
- Martin, John E. Holding the Balance. A History of New Zealand's Department of Labour 1891–1995 (1997)
- Nolan, Melanie. "Classic Third Way or Before its Time? The New Zealand Labour Party in Local and Transnational Context," Labour History Review (2010) 75#1 pp 98–113.
- Olssen, Erik. The Red Feds: Revolutionary Industrial Unionism and the New Zealand Federation of Labour 1908–1914 (1988)

== Māori ==
- Davidson, Janet M. The Prehistory of New Zealand (1987)
- Hill, Richard S. Maori and the State: Crown-Maori Relations in New Zealand/Aotearoa, 1950–2000 (2010)
- Iho, Taonga Tuku. Encyclopedia of Maori Culture (2002)
- Pool, D. Ian. "Post-War Trends in Maori Population Growth," Population Studies (1967) 21#2 pp. 87–98 in JSTOR
- Pool, D. Ian. Maori Population of New Zealand, 1769–1971(1989)
- Williams, Adrian. Politics of the New Zealand Maori: Protest and co-operation, 1891–1909 (1969)

== Political history ==
- Bassett, Michael (1982). Three Party Politics in New Zealand 1911–1931. Auckland: Historical Publications. ISBN 0-86870-006-1.
- Boston, Jonathan. Left Turn: The New Zealand general election of 1999 (Victoria U.P, 2000)
- Burdon, R. M. The New Dominion. A Social and Political History of New Zealand, 1918–1939 (Wellington: A. H. & A. W. Reed, 1965)
- Burdon, Randal Mathews (1955). King Dick: A Biography of Richard John Seddon. Christchurch: Whitcombe and Tombs.
- Davis, Richard. Irish Issues in New Zealand Politics, 1868–1922 (Dunedin, 1974)
- Easton, Brain. Making of Rogernomics (1989) on late 1980s
- Gee, David (1993). My Dear Girl: A biography of Elizabeth and James McCombs. Christchurch: Treehouse. ISBN 0-473-02084-X.
- Grant, David (2014). The Mighty Totara: The life and times of Norman Kirk. Auckland: Random House. ISBN 9781775535799.
- Gustafson, Barry (1980). Labour's path to political independence: The Origins and Establishment of the New Zealand Labour Party, 1900–19. Auckland, New Zealand: Auckland University Press. ISBN 0-19-647986-X.
- Gustafson, Barry (1986). From the Cradle to the Grave: A biography of Michael Joseph Savage. Auckland, New Zealand: Reed Methuen. ISBN 0-474-00138-5.
- Gustafson, Barry (1986). The First 50 Years : A History of the New Zealand National Party. Auckland: Reed Methuen. ISBN 0-474-00177-6.
- Gustafson, Barry (2002). His Way: A Biography of Robert Muldoon. Auckland: Auckland University Press. ISBN 978-1-86940-236-5.
- Gustafson, Barry (2008). Kiwi Keith: A Biography of Keith Holyoake. Auckland: Auckland University Press. ISBN 978-1-86940-400-0.
- Hamer, David A. (1988). The New Zealand Liberals: The Years of Power, 1891–1912. Auckland: Auckland University Press. ISBN 1-86940-014-3. OCLC 18420103.
- Levine, Stephen and Nigel S. Roberts, eds. The Baubles of Office: The New Zealand General Election of 2005 (Victoria U.P, 2007)
- Levine, Stephen and Nigel S. Roberts, eds. Key to Victory: The New Zealand General Election of 2008 (Victoria U.P, 2010)
- Russell, Marcia (1996). Revolution: New Zealand from Fortress to Free Market. Hodder Moa Beckett. ISBN 1869584287. on Rogernomics on 1980s
- Sinclair, Keith (1976). Walter Nash. Auckland: Oxford University Press. ISBN 0-19-647949-5., Labour prime minister 1957–60
- Watson, James, and Lachy Paterson, eds. A Great New Zealand Prime Minister? Reappraising William Ferguson Massey (2010), essays by scholars on the Reform Party Prime Minister 1912–25

== Social history ==
- Barton R. "History of science in Aotearoa New Zealand" The British Journal for the History of Science. 2025;58(1):117-126. doi:10.1017/S0007087424001547
- Bryder L. " 'A health resort for consumptives': Tuberculosis and immigration to New Zealand, 1880–1914" Medical History. 1996;40(4):453-471. doi:10.1017/S002572730006169X
- Fairburn, Miles. The Ideal Society and Its Enemies: The Foundations of Modern New Zealand Society, 1850–1900 (1989) [doi:10.1017/S0020859000009913 online review of this book]
- Porritt A. " The history of Medicine in New Zealand" Medical History 1967;11(4):334-344. doi:10.1017/S0025727300012485
- Rice GW. "How reminders of the 1918–19 pandemic helped Australia and New Zealand respond to COVID-19" Journal of Global History 2020; 15(3):421-433. doi:10.1017/S1740022820000285
- Ryan, Greg. "Drink and the Historians: Sober Reflections on Alcohol in New Zealand 1840–1914," New Zealand Journal of History (2010) 44#1 pp 35–53. Examines drinking patterns, why men drank, whether drinking was excessive compared to other countries, how drinking behaviour evolved, and the social role of brewers and the pub owners.
- Ryan, Greg. The Making of New Zealand Cricket: 1832–1914 (2004) excerpt and text search

== Religion and society ==
- Else, Anne, ed. Women Together A History of Women's Organizations in New Zealand (Wellington: Daphne Brasell, 1993)
- Morrison, Hugh. "Globally and Locally Positioned: New Zealand Perspectives on the Current Practice of Religious History," Journal of Religious History (2011) 35#2 pp 181–198; historiography
- Morrison, Hugh. "The 'joy and heroism of doing good': The New Zealand Missionary" Record and Late-Nineteenth-Century Protestant Children's Missionary Support," Journal of New Zealand Literature: JNZL (2010) No. 28, Part 2: Special Issue: Cultures of Print in Colonial New Zealand pp. 158–182
- Stenhouse, John. "Christianity, Modernity and Culture: New Perspectives On New Zealand History"
- Tennant, Margaret. The Fabric of Welfare: Voluntary Organisations, Government and Welfare in New Zealand, 1840–2005 (2007)

== Settlement, migration, demography ==
- Adams, Peter. Fatal Necessity: British Intervention in New Zealand, 1830–47 (1978)
- Akenson, Donald Harman. Half the World from Home: Perspectives on the Irish in New Zealand, 1860–1950 (Wellington, 1990)
- Arnold, Rollo. The farthest promised land: English villagers, New Zealand immigrants of the 1870s (1981)
- Borrie W. D. Immigration to New Zealand: 1854–1938 (Canberra: Australian National University, 1991)
- Bueltmann, Tanja. "'No Colonists are more Imbued with their National Sympathies than Scotchmen,'" New Zealand Journal of History (2009) 43#2 pp 169–181. Covering the period from 1841 to 1930, the article examines the many Caledonian societies. They organised sports teams to entice the young and preserved an idealised Scottish national myth (based on Robert Burns) for the elderly. They gave Scots a path to assimilation and cultural integration as Scottish New Zealanders.
- Byrnes, Giselle. "Nation and Migration: Postcolonial Perspectives," New Zealand Journal of History (2009) 43#2 pp 123–132.
- Coleman, Peter J. "The New Zealand Frontier and the Turner Thesis," Pacific Historical Review (1958) 27#3 pp. 221–237 in JSTOR
- Fraser, Lyndon, ed. A Distant Shore: Irish Migration and New Zealand Settlement (Dunedin, 2000)
- Gandar, J.M. "New Zealand Net Migration in the Latter Part of the Nineteenth Century," Australian Economic History Review (1979) 19:151-68
- Neville, R. J. Warwick and C.James O'Neill, eds. Population of New Zealand: Interdisciplinary Perspectives (1979)
- Pool, Ian, Arunachalam Dharmalingam, and Janet Sceats. The New Zealand Family since 1840: A Demographic History (Auckland University Press, 2007). 474 pp.

== World wars ==
=== First World War ===
- Baker, Paul, King and Country Call: New Zealanders, Conscription and the Great War (1988)
- Boyack, Nicholas. Behind the lines: The lives of New Zealand soldiers in the First World War (1989)
- Condliffe, J. B. "New Zealand during the War," Economic Journal (1919) 29#114 pp. 167–185 in JSTOR, free, economic mobilisation
- Crawford, John, and Ian McGibbon, eds. New Zealand's Great War: New Zealand, the Allies and the First World War (2008)
- Parsons, Gwen. "The New Zealand Home Front during World War One and World War Two." History Compass 11.6 (2013): 419-428.
- Pugsley, Christopher. The ANZAC experience: New Zealand, Australia and Empire in the First World War (2004)

=== Second World War ===
- Baker, J. V. T. War Economy (1965) NZ official history
- Montgomerie, Deborah. The Women's War: New Zealand Women 1939–45 (2001) argues that the Second World War was not a major turning point in the status of women
- Parsons, Gwen. "The New Zealand Home Front during World War One and World War Two," History Compass (2013) 11#6 pp 419–428, online
- Taylor, Nancy M. The Home Front Volume I NZ official history (1986); Volume II
- Whitfeld, Frederick Lloyd. Political and External Affairs (1958) NZ official history
- Hall, D. O. W. "Women at War," in Episodes & Studies Volume 1 (Historical Publications Branch, Wellington, New Zealand, 1948) pp 1–33 online

== Historiography ==
- Austrin, Terry, and John Farnsworth. "Assembling Histories: J. G. A. Pocock, Aotearoa/New Zealand and the British World," History Compass (Sep 2009), 7#5 pp 1286–1302
- Tony Ballantyne, "Culture and Colonization: Revisiting the Place of Writing in Colonial New Zealand" in The Journal of New Zealand Studies (2009) This essay offers an overview of recent historical writing on colonialism.
- Tony Ballantyne, On Place, Space and Mobility in Nineteenth Century New Zealand in The New Zealand Journal of History (2011)" This examines national history and its limits.
- Hunter, Philippa (2011). "Disturbing History's Identity in the New Zealand Curriculum to Free Up Historical Thinking". Curriculum Matters. 7 – via Questia.
- Pickles, Katie. "The Obvious and the Awkward: Postcolonialism and the British World," New Zealand Journal of History (2011) 45#1 pp 85–101; looks at metropole and colony
- Pollock, Jacob. "Cultural Colonization and Textual Biculturalism," New Zealand Journal of History (2007) 41#2 pp 180–198. Compares the approaches in James Belich's Making Peoples: A History of the New Zealanders. From Polynesian Settlement to the End of the Nineteenth Century (1996) and Paradise Reforged: A History of the New Zealanders. From the 1880s to the Year 2000 (2001) with those of Michael King's The Penguin History of New Zealand (2003). Responding to Maori arguments that the colonial narrative of Pakeha history was a device to privilege the legitimacy of British colonisation, Belich wrote a radically bicultural story. He says the two peoples—both immigrants—developed their mother cultures inside New Zealand. King takes a more traditional approach that portrays a new unified state in which there are not two distinct and equal cultures but two principal varieties of New Zealanders.
- Tony Ballantyne, 'Culture and Colonization: Revisiting the Place of Writing in Colonial New Zealand' in The Journal of New Zealand Studies (2009). This essay offers an overview of recent historical writing on colonialism.

== Online reference works ==
- The Dictionary of New Zealand Biography. www.teara.govt.nz/en/biographies As well as all the Prime Ministers, Māori chiefs, early settlers and sporting legends, this also includes con artists, adventurers and other lesser known but interesting characters from New Zealand's past.
- Te Ara: The Encyclopedia of New Zealand. www.teara.govt.nz A work still in progress, this will eventually offer short but comprehensive snapshots of most aspects of New Zealand, past and present.
- NZ History An authoritative and fairly comprehensive online source, produced by the History Group of the Ministry for Culture and Heritage.
- The New Zealand Journal of History complete texts of scholarly articles and book reviews; quarterly since 1967
- The Cyclopedia of New Zealand 1897–1908. Encyclopedia covering people, organisations and places.
- Official History of New Zealand in the Second World War 50-volume set now digitised by the New Zealand Electronic Text Centre
- Campaign histories and the regimental histories covering New Zealand's involvement in the First World War by a variety of authors, digitised by the New Zealand Electronic Text Centre
- New Zealand history at the New Zealand Electronic Text Centre
- The Year-book of the Imperial Institute of the United Kingdom, the colonies and India: a statistical record of the resources and trade of the colonial and Indian possessions of the British Empire (2nd. ed. 1893) 880pp; New Zealand = pp 719–754 online edition

== Primary sources and oral histories ==
- New Zealand Official Yearbook annual 1893–2008
- Fraser, Lyndon, and Katie Pickles, eds. Shifting Centres: Women and Migration in New Zealand History (U. of Otago Press, 2002), 224pp; personal accounts, mostly after 1945
- McIntyre, W. David and W. J. Gardner, eds. Speeches and Documents on New Zealand History (1971), 489pp
- Parr, Alison. Home: Civilian New Zealanders Remember the Second World War (2010)
- Simpson, Tony, ed. The Sugarbag Years: An Oral History of the 1930s Depression in New Zealand (2009)
