= Vic Cavanagh =

Vic Cavanagh may refer to:

- Vic Cavanagh (rugby union coach), known as "Old Vic" Cavanagh, New Zealand rugby union administrator
- Vic Cavanagh (sportsman), known as "Young Vic" Cavanagh, New Zealand rugby union administrator and cricketer
