= Sarah Cohen =

Sarah or Sara Cohen may refer to:

- Sarah Blacher Cohen (1936–2008), writer, scholar, and playwright
- Sarah Cohen (journalist), American journalist
- Sarah Jacob Cohen, member of Kochi's Jewish community
- Sara Cohen (musicologist), musicologist and academic
- Sara Cohen (born 1980), American author and physician who uses the pen name Freida McFadden

== See also ==
- Sara Cohen School, Dunedin, New Zealand
