= Reform Party (New Zealand) =

Defunct political party in New Zealand

- Founder: William Massey
- Founded: 11 February 1909
- Dissolved: 1936; 90 years ago
- Merged into: National Party
- Youth wing: Junior Reform League
- Ideology: Conservatism; Anti-socialism
- Political position: Centre-right
- National affiliation: United/Reform Coalition (1931–36)

The Reform Party, formally the New Zealand Political Reform League, was a centre-right political party in New Zealand, and the country's second major political party. Founded in 1909 as a conservative response to the Liberal Party, it was led for most of its history by William Massey, who became prime minister in 1912. The party remained in government from 1912 to 1928, promoting rural interests and opposing socialism. After losing office, Reform formed a coalition with the United Party (a remnant of the Liberals) in 1931, and in 1936 the two parties merged to form the present-day National Party.

== Foundation ==
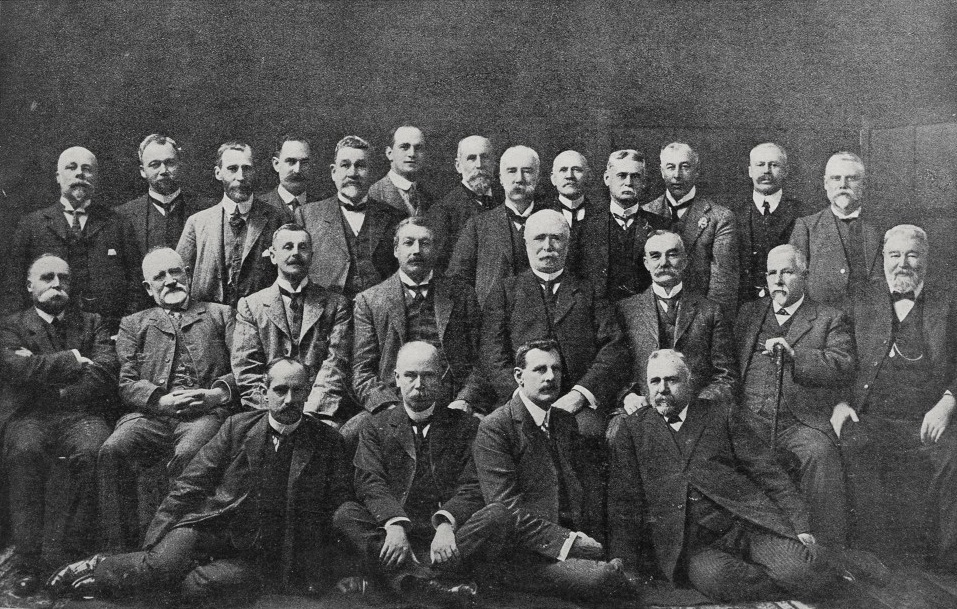
The Reform Party Caucus, 1909.

The Liberal Party, founded by John Ballance and fortified by Richard Seddon, was highly dominant in New Zealand politics at the beginning of the 20th century. The conservative opposition, consisting only of independents, was disorganised and demoralised. It had no cohesive plan to counter the Liberal Party's dominance, and could not always agree on a single leader — it was described by one historian as resembling a disparate band of guerrillas, and presented no credible threat to continued Liberal Party rule.

Gradually, however, the Liberals began to falter — the first blow came with the death of Richard Seddon, their popular leader, but other factors contributed to their decline. Importantly for conservatives, the Liberals were slowly losing support from small farmers, who had once backed the Liberals due to their promise of land reform. Having achieved the land reforms, farmers had little reason to continue their support for the Liberals, and drifted towards the socially conservative opposition. At the same time, the Liberals were also slowly losing their other base of support, the urban working class — the Ballance and Seddon governments had introduced many reformist labour laws, but under later leaders (notably Joseph Ward) the reforms had slowed. The Liberals were split between the farmers and the workers, attempting to please both and therefore satisfying neither. The attempts of the Liberals to win back the labour vote were decried by conservatives as "socialistic", and the flight of farmers and businessmen from the Liberal Party was accelerated. The conservative opposition, which pledged its opposition to the alleged socialist tendencies of the Liberals, was strengthened.

The foundation of the Reform Party was closely associated with this return of the opposition to political significance, and with growing agitation against the Liberal Party's alleged socialism. The party itself crystallised around a farmer-turned-politician named William Massey, who became the leader of most conservatives in Parliament in 1903 after serving many years prior as the conservative whip. Also closely linked to the group were the Political Reform League, Auckland's "National Association", and (in an unofficial capacity) the Farmers' Union. The opposition began referring to itself as the Reform Party in 1909, and adopted a common platform for contesting elections. Among the party's important policy planks were farmers' freehold and the reform of the public service.

Despite campaigning heavily against the government's "socialism", it did not propose to undo the Liberal Party's labour and welfare reforms. In 1911 a consistent theme of the Reform campaign was that it stood for "true Liberalism" and the Opposition accepted the permanency of the basic reforms of the Liberals in the 1890s. They claimed patronage, corruption and "Tammanyism" (patronage based on connections) for example in civil service appointments.

== Reform Government ==
In the 1911 elections, the Reform Party won thirty-seven seats compared with thirty-three for the Liberals. Supporters of the Liberals denied that Reform had won a mandate to rule, however, pointing out that the country quota (a system in which rural electorates were smaller than urban ones, meaning that rural areas were slightly over-represented in Parliament) worked to "inflate" Reform's vote. Nevertheless, it did not take long for the Liberal government, now ruling only with the support of independents, to fall. Ward resigned in 1912, and after successor Thomas Mackenzie lost a confidence vote, William Massey became Prime Minister on 10 July 1912.

In government, the Reform Party implemented many of its policies regarding freehold and public service reform. Many other Liberal-era policies were not changed, however, and Reform gained further support from disillusioned members of the Liberal Party. Reform also demonstrated its tough line against "socialism" with its responses to a number of notable strikes — the Waihi miners' strike, led by left-wing "Red Fed" unions which Massey condemned as "enemies of order", was harshly suppressed, and one worker died. A dockworkers' strike in 1913 was also broken. The strikes prompted considerable concern about socialism in certain sectors of society, boosting Reform's re-election in the 1914 elections. While the party's share of the vote increased, Massey was disappointed that the party only won by two votes. In addition, the election was marred by allegations by both Reform and Liberals of voting irregularities in the Māori electorates. Following the outbreak of World War One, the Reform and Liberal parties formed a National Government in August 1915.

After the Liberal leader Joseph Ward rejected a Reform caucus resolution in November 1918 the two parties merge, Massey announced in May 1919 that the two parties would contest the 1919 election separately. The National Government subsequently lapsed in August 1919. During the 1919 election held on 17 December, Reform further strengthened its position, winning 47 seats (37%) of the vote. The Liberals won 19 seats while the Labour Party won eight seats.

In the 1922 elections, however, the approach of depression cost the government to lose nine seats, dropping from 47 to 38. The Liberals gained 24 seats while Labour gained 17 seats at the Reform party's expense. In order to maintain its majority, Reform was forced to build an unstable coalition with three former Liberal Members of Parliament, who became independents. By that time, New Zealand politics had developed into a three-party system consisting of Reform, Labour and the Liberals.

In 1925, Massey died. After a period under interim leader Francis Bell, Reform chose Gordon Coates as its new leader. Coates, while not regarded as politically astute, was relatively popular with the public, and campaigned well. In the 1925 elections, Reform won a surprisingly high number of seats — 55, compared with 12 for Labour and 11 for the Liberals. This victory was not as pronounced in the statistics for the popular vote since many believed that Reform had profited from the three-party configuration, with the anti-Reform vote being split.

Coates was also unable to live up to the high expectations generated by the election result. Coates lacked the political skills needed to manage the Reform party and parliamentary caucus, and also retained several poor-performing ministers. Under Coates, the Reform Government passed the Family Allowances Act, which was unpopular with party supporters. Coates' administration was also blamed for a major drop in farm export prices in 1926. Reform also lost two by-elections in Eden and Raglan to the Labour Party, which began positioning itself as the new official opposition.

In the 1928 elections, however, there was a substantial reversal. The new United Party led by former Liberal leader Joseph Ward, founded on the ashes of the Liberal Party, experienced a surge of support. While Reform's parliamentary presence was reduced to 28 seats, the United Party won 27 seats, Labour won 19 seats, the new Country Party gained one seat, and there were five independents. The United Party formed a new government with the support of Labor and the five independents.

== Opposition and Coalition ==
The Reform Party, still led by Coates, continued in opposition. The worsening economic situation left the United Party government struggling, and in 1931, the Labour Party withdrew its support in protest at certain economic measures. Following Ward's resignation in May 1930, George Forbes became the leader of the United Party and Prime Minister. The Reform Party reluctantly agreed to support the United Party government, as the depression had raised fears of major gains for Labour if an election were held. United and Reform established a coalition government, with United's Forbes remaining Prime Minister but Reform's Downie Stewart becoming Finance Minister.

In coalition, the two parties suffered only minor losses in the 1931 elections; the United-Reform Coalition government won 51 seats while Labour won 24 seats. As the depression failed to dissipate, however, the government became more and more unpopular, and support for the Labour Party soared. Clashes between Gordon Coates (who still led Reform) and Downie Stewart over economic policy eventually prompted Downie Stewart's resignation in January 1933, earning the government a new critic and hurting its popularity still further. In addition, some of the coalition's measures to revive the economy were condemned by some as "socialist" — the Democrat Party, founded to fight this "socialism", cost the coalition a certain amount of support. In the 1935 general election, the coalition to suffered a massive defeat to the Labour Party, winning only 19 seats to Labour's 53.

Shortly after losing the 1935 elections, Reform and United resolved to merge completely in 1936, creating a united front against Labour. The new group was named the National Party, and has remained Labour's principal opponent ever since. The merged party's first three leaders-Adam Hamilton, Sidney Holland, and Keith Holyoake—came from the Reform half of the merger.

== Parliamentary leaders ==
Key:
Reform Liberal United Labour
PM: Prime Minister
LO: Leader of the Opposition
†: Died in office

| No. | Leader | Portrait | Term | | Position | Prime Minister |
|---|---|---|---|---|---|---|
| 1 | William Massey | | February 1909 | 10 May 1925† | LO 1909–1912 | Ward |
| 1 | William Massey | | February 1909 | 10 May 1925† | LO 1909–1912 | Mackenzie |
| 1 | William Massey | | February 1909 | 10 May 1925† | PM 1912–1925 | Massey |
| 2 | Francis Bell (interim) | | 14 May 1925 | 27 May 1925 | PM 1925 | Bell |
| 3 | Gordon Coates | | 27 May 1925 | 13 May 1936 | PM 1925–1928 | Coates |
| 3 | Gordon Coates | | 27 May 1925 | 13 May 1936 | LO 1928–1931 | Ward |
| 3 | Gordon Coates | | 27 May 1925 | 13 May 1936 | LO 1928–1931 | Forbes |
| 3 | Gordon Coates | | 27 May 1925 | 13 May 1936 | Junior coalition partner in government 1931–1935 | Forbes |
| 3 | Gordon Coates | | 27 May 1925 | 13 May 1936 | Junior coalition partner in opposition 1935–1936 | Savage |
Reform Party merged into National Party 1936.

=== Electoral results ===
| Election | # of votes | % of vote | # of seats won | Government/opposition? |
|---|---|---|---|---|
| 1911 | 159,309 | 33.37 | 37 / 80 | Government |
| 1914 | 243,025 | 47.1 | 40 / 80 | Government |
| 1919 | 193,676 | 35.7 | 43 / 80 | Government |
| 1922 | 249,735 | 39.35 | 37 / 80 | Government |
| 1925 | 324,239 | 47.18 | 55 / 80 | Government |
| 1928 | 271,259 | 35.87 | 28 / 80 | Opposition |
| 1931 | 190,170 | 26.6 | 28 / 80 | Government (coalition) |
| 1935 | 285,422† | 33.48† | 9 / 80 | Opposition |

†Total Coalition vote.

== Sources ==
- Bassett, Michael (1982). Three Party Politics in New Zealand, 1911–1931. Auckland: Historical Publications. ISBN 0868700061.
- Burdon, R.M. (1965). The New Dominion. A Social and Political History of New Zealand, 1918–1939. Wellington: A. H. & A. W. Reed.
- Gustafson, Barry (1986). The First 50 Years: A History of New Zealand National Party. Auckland: Reed Methuen Publishers. ISBN 0474001776.
- Hamer, David A. (1988). The New Zealand Liberals: The Years of Power, 1891–1912. Auckland: Auckland University Press. ISBN 1-86940-014-3.
- James, Colin (2017). National at 80: The Story of the New Zealand National Party. Auckland: David Bateman Ltd. ISBN 9781869539818.
- King, Michael (2003). The Penguin History of New Zealand (First ed.). Auckland: Penguin Books. ISBN 0143018671.
- McKinnon, Malcolm (2016). The Broken Decade: Prosperity, depression and recovery in New Zealand, 1928-39. Dunedin: Otago University Press. ISBN 9781927322260.
- Sinclair, Keith; Dalziel, Raewyn (2000). A History of New Zealand: Revised Edition (Fifth revised ed.). Auckland: Penguin Books. ISBN 978-0140298758.
- Sinclair, Keith (1988). A History of New Zealand. Pelican Books. ISBN 9780140228212.
