= The Caversham Project =

Research project based in Dunedin, New Zealand

The Caversham Project was a research project initiated in the mid-1970s by Erik Olssen and Tom Brooking of the Department of History at Otago University. The study gathered data on adults living in Caversham and other southern suburbs of Dunedin, New Zealand from 1893–1940 to explore the development of modern New Zealand urban society. Caversham and the other suburbs were chosen because at the time they were one of the largest industrial districts in New Zealand. The project was carried out in several phases: investigating social and geographical mobility, the analysis of paid work, and gender and social structure. The project was funded initially by the University of Otago and later by the Foundation for Research, Science and Technology. Publications analysing the data have been produced after the project ceased. Jock Phillips noted in Te Ara: The Encyclopedia of New Zealand, that the project "pioneered serious labour history...[drawing]...on a large database of information about Caversham in South Dunedin for important books analyzing work and social hierarchy."

== Origins and establishment ==
The project was said to have originated from a debate within academia about the significance of social class in New Zealand's history [and was] "designed to analyze the relevance of class by systematically measuring the extent of social and geographic mobility in Caversham borough". The streets comprising the Caversham Borough were chosen as the study area, because the adult population could be largely reconstructed from electoral rolls and the Census-reported population totals, and the borough contained "an approximate microcosm of the larger urban occupational and class structure." From 1975 until 1901, Olssen was Principal Investigator.

In 1995 the project received considerable funding from the Foundation for Research, Science and Technology, and with the appointment of Hamish James as a full-time Research Assistant, the data was able to be managed electronically. Building the New World: work, politics and society in Caversham, 1880s–1920s (1995) , assembled further background information about the project and began an interpretation of the data, clarifying that a specific aim of the project was to investigate how "work in the skilled trades, politics and society" were related and how the themes of the 'social laboratory'—equality, independence, security and opportunity—were achieved by working men and women in their workplaces." The publication also defined what "skilled' work was and showed that between 1902 and 1922 "skilled men dominated Caversham".

The nine-level occupational classification used in the project was based on several working papers, later summarised in Class and Occupation The New Zealand Reality (2005), and Melanie Nolan unpacked the nine identified occupational classes as: large employers, professionals, semi-professionals, small employers and the self-employed, officials and supervisors, white-collar, skilled, semi-skilled and unskilled. Comparing some of the data from Caversham with the national profile was hindered by issues such as ambiguous names for various occupations, however the researchers showed similarities between occupational structures at the national and local levels, evident for each of the nine occupations studied within the Caversham Project.

== Managing issues with the database ==
The first stage of the project was to create a statistical database of all adults who lived in the suburb. Because The Caversham Project was forced initially to rely on street directories and electoral rolls, the project, of necessity, had to engage with a local community, rather than a national sample. Focusing on a particular local community – the normal American approach – resulted in several problems. It was difficult to ascertain if the occupational structure in Caversham was typical of New Zealand in general and the extent to which the social–occupational structure in urban New Zealand was comparable to those in other capitalist-industrial societies. This was further complicated because the national occupational structure could only be reconstructed from Census data for the study period (initially 1901–22). Unfortunately all the census returns had been destroyed so it was necessary to rely on data that had been organised to answer different questions without regard to any variations within regions, or how these might be related regional to "national occupational structures and the larger international division of labour." The position was taken therefore, that "local case studies are the only viable way of identifying occupational structure and mobility in New Zealand".Criminologist Greg Newbold noted that this approach [allowed identification of] "work mobility, geographical movement and residential differentiation in South Dunedin, and to find out how typical this area was in comparison with the national structure."

An audit of the database in 1986 showed it to have many errors and in 1988, using the corrected data, Judi Boyd (the auditor) and Olssen wrote the first systematic study of mobility, The Skilled Workers: Journeymen and Masters in Caversham, 1880–1914 in the New Zealand Journal of History. There were also challenges involved in creating a statistical database of all adults who lived in the suburb. This made it difficult to ascertain if the occupational structure in Caversham was typical of New Zealand in general, and the extent to which the social–occupational structure in urban New Zealand was comparable to those in other capitalist-industrial societies. Nevertheless, the researchers concluded that local case studies could identify occupational structure and mobility in New Zealand, a position also supported by Newbold.

== Key areas of focus ==
=== Social and geographical mobility ===
In An Accidental Utopia? Social Mobility and the Foundations of an Egalitarian Society, 1880–1940 (2010), the fourth book published by the Caversham Project, it was noted in the preface that the work marked a return to the project's key objective: the identification of the extent of both work life and inter-generational occupational mobility; the relationship (if any) between levels of mobility and political behaviour; and mobility's larger social significance. The authors showed that high mobility did not necessarily mean "weak class boundaries, a reduced possibility for class consciousness...[or]...a lower likelihood of class-based political action". Olssen et al. noted that the brief of the book was to determine the nature of a capitalist structure in New Zealand and to compare whether it was "more or less open than urban societies in Britain or the United States...[and]...to test the widespread belief that class-based political systems could emerge only in relatively rigid societies." The authors brought together the data from the Cavendish Project – which now included the three southern boroughs – and showed how social structure and mobility were determined by marital mobility, how men and women chose spouses, occupational pathways followed by men, intergenerational mobility and the expansion of occupational opportunities. The final chapter returned to the question of whether Dunedin was a special place, and if so, what patterns could explain this. The conclusion was that the town had some typical features of industrial capitalism modified by the handicraft sector which had arisen because of a small and scattered population. This was said to have resulted in "narrowing the distance from the social floor to the ceiling...[with]...shortages of labour [reducing] pay differentials for skills among manual workers", allowing the authors to justify calling Dunedin an "accidental utopia" because nobody intended for there to be a small population with limited resources [or] "recognized the way in which such factors allowed people to create a congenial society."

In his review of the book, Jim McAloon from Victoria University of Wellington agreed that the relationship between social mobility and class was a major sociological debate and acknowledged the authors' view that a case study such as the Caversham Project can show the interrelated nature of class, gender and race in developing a frame of reference which allows valid contributions to the discourse. McAloon saw the strength of the book as "its rigorous demonstration that...South Dunedin was, therefore, a more open society than Britain, and by extension the same is true of the rest of settler New Zealand; marriage was relatively open, so were occupational choices, and the upper and middle classes constantly refreshed themselves." Sociologist Peter Davis described the book as ambitious in using "detailed historical and quantitative analysis of information" from the Caversham Project [to] "develop an argument about the social structure and urban expression of a new settler society." Davis asserted that it was legitimate for the book to take a structuralist approach that used "conceptual and empirical tools" and suggested that such a model could be applied to larger cities such as Auckland [to build] "our understanding of the modern and post-modern New Zealand in its vibrant, structural and cultural complexity." Writing in the Otago Daily Times one reviewer noted [that the authors] "approach their work like a scientific experiment, complete with graphs and tabulations, knowing full well that in science there are no final answers, only workable hypotheses supported by the best available evidence...[but]... a sort of conclusion does emerge....it is clear that social class was and is important in New Zealand history.

Building Attachment in Families, a 2011 funded project managed by the Centre for Research, Evaluation and Social Assessment (CRESA), had the goal of identifying "the mechanisms, processes and relations required to build and sustain community and family wellbeing, optimize attachment in changing communities and address problems arising out of transience and residential mobility". The project addressed a lack of theorizing on geographical mobility by using data from the Caversham Project. The resulting research confirmed high levels of fluidity of population within the suburb, including movement to neighbouring areas as the "older parts of Caversham and South Dunedin became congested by New Zealand standards...[contributing]...to fluidity of urban society in New Zealand." The importance of children being able to negotiate class differences, said by Pitirim Sorokin as likely to build "intellectual vitality and cultural innovation", underpinned in Dunedin "the emergence of an egalitarian society characterized by a deepening consensus about the importance of looking after those who, for whatever reason, could not always look after themselves...[contributing]...to a vibrant and dynamic society."

=== The analysis of paid work ===
A significant focus of the project was an in-depth analysis of the organisation of paid work in the study area, which included many small-scale businesses and several large ones, especially the railway workshops. After analysing the survival of the handicraft trades, where young people served apprenticeship before becoming journeymen/women, two of the major sources of employment were investigated: the building trades, which were dominated by small-scale firms and self-employed tradesmen; and the engineering trades where most men were employed in large workshops such as the Hillside Railway workshops. In both, it was shown that the culture of craft was central and fundamental. One significant implication of this, especially in decentralized industries, was that many men, having served an apprenticeship and then worked as a journeyman, set up their own businesses and often became small-scale employers. Further work on the Hillside Railway workshops challenged the idea that large-scale industry inevitably reduced skilled workers' agency, and showed that the skilled workers of Hillside enjoyed and maintained almost complete control over the labour process, [and] "their skill...gave them a sense of identity and pride."

One article showed how the "composition and character of the urban skilled workforce" in Caversham informed the investigation of the role played by skilled workers in the process of class formation and how this shaped later political developments in New Zealand. Another piece made the point that because classification of skilled workers was complex, with some stratification, management of potential conflicts began the movement toward a united union for the sector underpinned by "artisan radicalism". This was led by Charles Thorn a self-employed, politically active carpenter who, in 1881, worked with Robert Stout to organize the Otago Trades and Labour Council. In 1885, after a congress of unionists from across the colony organized by Thorn had resolved to support working classes to be better organized [to] " advance their interests and secure proper representation...some 600 unionists marched through the city to the Garrison Hall, where Thorn moved a resolution encouraging working men to form trade unions." Through the 1890s, those working in handcraft trades in Caversham were said to have brought a union-based radicalism that was influencing political developments around industrial relations, shaping class ideologies and the rise of left-wing parties. This was noted at a time that unions developed in the 1880s during industrial unrest in New Zealand, and in particular after the release of the Sweating Commission, [while in]..."Dunedin public-spirited citizens organized women employed in the clothing factories where 'sweating' was endemic, into a Tailoresses' Union."

Working Lives c.1900 A Photographic Essay launched in August 2014, described how the Caversham Project had evolved into a study of the agency of working people in the suburb to creatively modify capitalism, and the intention of the work was to illustrate, mostly in a photographic manner, "two processes fundamental to creating a new society: the transformation of a wild landscape into farmland and then industrial heartland; and the transplantation of the knowledge and skills acquired in the Old World essential to building a new world." The Otago Daily Times said Working Lives showed insight into the life of working-class people in what has become recognised as the first industrial suburb in New Zealand, and The Otago Settlers News acknowledged that the photographs had been collected from a range of sources including the Hocken Collections and the Alexander Turnbull Library in Wellington. Another reviewer said that the book [revealed] "a time when direct relationships between workers and employers, skill and what was crafted, were valued and primarily local" but suggests it is also an invitation "to celebrate community, and then to mourn its loss, because deindustrialization has eradicated such industrial workplace communities over the last thirty years." As the last publication arising from the Caversham Project, it has also been suggested "this is both a window into a past world and – often enough – a reminder that the past was as diverse as the present. Not always quaint and pretty, but not a wasteland either."

In reviewing the history of organized labour in Dunedin, the book noted that with the formation of the first women's union, the general acceptance by middle-class people in the town for unions, a series of publications calling for radical reform and support for legislative changes such as the Industrial Conciliation and Arbitration Act of 1894, workers in the town were able to support the development of an independent Labour Party to challenge the Seddon-led Lib-Lab government. At the same time the pro-labour and socialist leaders laid the foundation for an alliance with the local Roman Catholic community by denouncing the manner in which the British government had suppressed the 1916 Sinn Féin rebellion in Ireland. A group of Irish nationalists in Dunedin and supporters of Sinn Féin began publishing and advocating for their cause, later joined by Father James Kelly, the editor of the Catholic magazine The New Zealand Tablet. Harry Holland was said to have brokered an agreement that aligned Labour behind the cause of the Irish and in the 1922 New Zealand election this resulted in an increase in support for Labour. Working Lives challenged the view that the labour movement originated on the West Coast, and contended that the "masters and journeymen" in Dunedin had a key role in forming the Liberal-Labour coalition, and "skilled artisans and mechanics...laid the foundation or the unionization of the unskilled."

A reviewer noted that the exclusion of all rural data was a possible flaw of the project because it may have masked that many urban areas during the colonial period "contained primary industries — such as market gardening — within their borders", and some people in towns recorded 'farmer' as their occupation.

=== Gender and social structure ===
At around the time that the project received sufficient money to complete the analysis of occupational mobility in Caversham Borough 1901–22, the research team, now including Shaun Ryan and Maureen Hickey, realised that both the census and the street directories had stopped recording occupational information for almost all women. From 1902 onwards the Census increasingly used women's marital status rather than their occupation and it was concluded that "because the local labour market was deeply gendered...women in paid work or working for money [constituted] a distinct analytical problem." An effort was made to find archival sources relating to women's employment, for almost all young women entered the paid workforce between leaving school at around age 12 and marrying in their early twenties. Some of these complex issues had first become apparent in chapter four of Building the New World: work, politics and society in Caversham, 1880s–1920s (1995). In her review of the book Raewyn Dalziel of The University of Auckland acknowledged that the chapter on skilled working women used reliable sources that showed data for most women were excluded if they did not work for wages. Dalziel challenged the argument that "nobody who used the phrase 'working class' thought of women as members of this class except through relationship to a father or husband", but agreed that the term 'men' needed to be used carefully because of a "gendered ambiguity...[that]...alerts us to the need to re-read the evidence not only for the exclusions but for the way they point to inclusions and alternative meanings." In his review of the book, Len Richardson, a labour and sports historian at the University of Canterbury, contended that the study was significant because it traced the process by which the women of Caversham's skilled community were enabled to "acquire a skilled training which they hoped would enable them to attain a level of independence in their lives."

When it became apparent that improvements in electronic scanning made it possible to construct an error-free database for the three southern boroughs for a longer period, a larger multidisciplinary team was assembled in the late 1990 to analyse women's experience and the role of gender in structuring society. This team met regularly between 1998 and 2002 and produced Sites of Gender: Women, Men & Modernity in Southern Dunedin, 1890–1939, including one chapter The Landscape of Gender Politics: Place, People and Two Mobilisations, which put the premise of the book that in the southern suburbs of Dunedin in the 1880 and 1890s, the radicalisation of working men and the mobilisation of women to gain the vote, were both events that showed how embedded gender constitutes, and contributes to, an area's pattern of settlement. The chapter made the point that while this was "typical of New Zealand urban development at the time", the rest of the book would unpack the distinctiveness of southern Dunedin. The authors claimed that while an "older gender order" still existed within the context of the men's mobilisation, there were genuine changes happening in the lives of women. It concluded that the suburb's "distinctive mix of artisan radicalism, evangelicalism, Scottish commitment to education and high levels of work opportunities for young women disposed them to be something of a vanguard."

The chapter Working Gender, Gendering Work: Occupational Change and Continuity in Southern Dunedin, traced how, within a specific geographically defined space, the three southern boroughs, work, as a set of social practices became gendered between 1890 and 1939. The chapter unpacked urbanisation, industrialisation and contested beliefs about the roles and capabilities of men and women, shaped social and political contexts within which "the meaning of sexual bodily differences changed, and changed considerably." Greater employment opportunities for women presented as changing realities but this transition was complicated due to apprehension about the ability of women to perform some tasks; the word 'work' being used primarily to mean paid employment; and the political moves to normalise the status of the male breadwinner. The author's position in the chapter is that while some men were threatened by the possibility of women taking their jobs, the mobilisation of the workforce in the 1880s had many egalitarian aspects including the formation of some of the first women's unions. Women became increasingly confident and independent and were able to earn and spend more because most, on leaving school, found work in either the city's clothing and bootmaking factories or increasingly in the fast-expanding white-collar occupations in the city's thirteen department stores and the offices of the forward-looking companies. It was shown that these young women ignored nationality, religion and class in selecting a spouse, and were more likely to own their own house on marrying and thus live apart from their parents, [maintaining]..."the 'feisty' traditions of independent womanhood, alive and well in the many provincial and peripheral regions of Britain." It was also claimed that the consensus of "the importance of the male-breadwinner wage and full employment for men shaped both the Liberal-Labour legislative programme and the transformation of working-class male behaviour." Unions and politicians urged men to be temperate in their habits and consciously become a "domesticated husband and father." Men were expected to work hard, take pride in their skill and provide well for their families with many also having to show toughness, courage and strength during active service in World War I. The conclusion of the chapter was that the family had become symbolic and while work may have remaining a "refuge from home...most married men increasingly spent much of their free time with their families doing up their houses or cultivating their vegetable gardens." A reviewer said a key theme of the book was that during this "period of construction of new family forms, declining birth rates and enhanced expectations about the health and education of children, and Southern Dunedin men and women shared in all three". Patricia Grimshaw of the University of Melbourne commended the editors of the book in [undertaking]..."the ambitious task of placing gender at the centre of an analysis of work in Caversham, Dunedin, as the impact of modernity became starkly apparent." In the same piece Grimshaw acknowledged that the book's success was the result of excellent collection of wide-ranging data, [and from]..."the writers' grounding in the theoretical framework of gender studies."

Some of the team also developed a collaboration with a group of academics at the University of Canterbury headed by Professor Miles Fairburn which produced Class, Gender and the Vote (2005). The chapter 'For Better or Worse': Marriage Patterns in Dunedin's Southern Suburbs, 1881–1938 shared data [ that did establish] "the fundamental importance of marriage in shaping the experience, expectations, and the fate of women", and that there was a need to focus on the "historical sociology of marriage formation and mobility." It was noted that the post-1840 family in New Zealand shared many structural features with the Euro-American family, specifically men and women choosing their spouse to establish a new home and family when economically viable and as a result, [constituting the family] "as a significant economic, social and cultural institution." Data was unpacked showing low levels of endogamy with the author concluding therefore, that because marriage in New Zealand was becoming less shaped by choices made on the basis of "identities derived from skill or class", this led to a more open society from which "something of a consensus emerged in support for the state welfare interventions between 1840–1940". The chapter continued to explore the decisions young women made around work and marriage traced to greater educational and occupations and an awareness by 1900 of debates and movements in the wider world related to women's rights. The chapter suggested that the data showing an increase in women marrying after their twenties reflected a "dramatic growth and occupational opportunities for young women in Dunedin's southern suburbs."

== Museum exhibition ==
In 2002 staff at the Otago Settlers Museum and the Caversham Project Team collaborated to hold an exhibition. A later publication said the exhibition "sought to share the discoveries of the researchers with a wider audience" and backgrounded the study against the significant changes that were happening in the wider New Zealand society in a "time of rapid industrialisation and urbanisation". Seán Brosnahan, curator of the exhibition, noted its popularity, suggesting "[o]ne of the ironies of the research was that its information on working class people was only being communicated to academic audiences – the exhibition managed to bridge that gap and return the stories to the community." Erik Olssen said he was "thrilled to see the project’s spoils displayed in such a palatable fashion."

== Publications ==
- Olssen, Erik (1995). Building the New World: Work, Politics and Society in Caversham 1880s–1920s. Auckland University Press. p. 308. ISBN 9781869401061. Archived from the original on 3 February 2020.
- Brookes, Barbara; Cooper, Annabel; Law, Robin, eds. (2003). Sites of gender: women, men and modernity in Southern Dunedin, 1890–1939. Auckland University Press. ISBN 1869403053. Archived from the original on 20 February 2012 – via University of Otago.
- Olssen, Erik; Griffen, Clyde; Jones, Frank (2009). An Accidental Utopia? Social mobility and foundations of an egalitarian society, 1880–1940. Dunedin, NZ: Otago University Press. ISBN 978-1-877372-64-3. Archived from the original on 28 May 2023 – via Otago University.
- Olssen, Erik (2014). Working Lives c. 1900 A Photographic essay. Otago University Press. p. 176. ISBN 978-1-877578-51-9. Archived from the original on 25 March 2023 – via University of Otago.
