= Tony Ballantyne =

Tony Ballantyne may refer to:

- Tony Ballantyne (historian) (born 1972), New Zealand historian
- Tony Ballantyne (writer) (born 1972), British science-fiction writer
