= Lucy Mackintosh (historian) =

New Zealand historian, curator and author

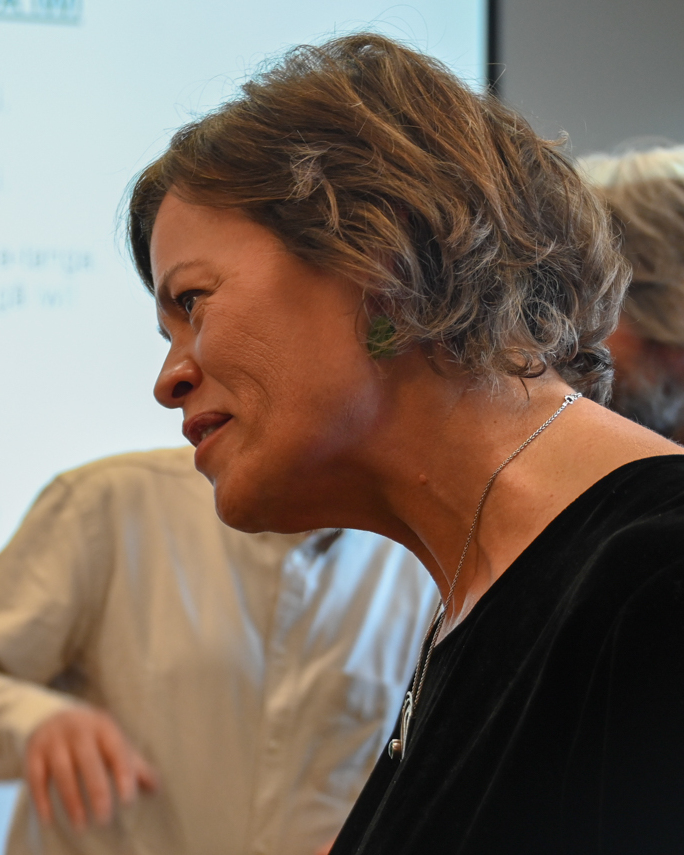
- Mackintosh in 2025
- Awards: Ernest Scott Prize (2022); Ian Wards Prize (2022); Keith Sinclair Scholarship

Academic background
- Education: University of Auckland
- Thesis: Shifting Grounds: History, Memory and Materiality in Auckland Landscapes c.1350–2018 (2019)
- Doctoral advisor: Caroline Daley; Anne Salmond

Academic work
- Discipline: History
- Sub-discipline: Cultural history; Māori history; environmental history
- Institutions: University of Auckland
- Notable works: Shifting Grounds: Deep Histories of Tāmaki Makaurau Auckland (2021)
- Website: profiles.auckland.ac.nz/lmac027/about

Lucy Annabel Mackintosh is a New Zealand historian, curator and author who is a senior research fellow of Auckland War Memorial Museum in Auckland, New Zealand. She is an honorary historian in the Faculty of Arts at the Waipapa Taumata Rau/University of Auckland and a researcher for the Ministry for Culture and Heritage working on the Dictionary of New Zealand Biography. Mackintosh is best known for her book, Shifting Grounds: Deep Histories of Tāmaki Makaurau Auckland, which won the prestigious Ernest Scott Prize in 2022 and the Ian Wards Prize of the Te Rua Mahara o te Kāwanatanga/Archives New Zealand.

== Early life and education ==
Mackintosh graduated from the University of Otago in 1992 with a Bachelor of Arts degree, and received her Master of Arts in history from the University of Auckland in 1994. Her MA thesis was in environmental history. After graduating, Mackintosh worked as a researcher at Kingston University, and began working on the Dictionary of New Zealand Biography.

== Career ==
In the 2000s Mackintosh worked for numerous groups, including the Ministry for the Environment and the heritage division of Te Kaunihera o Tāmaki Makaurau/Auckland Council. From 2005 to 2014, Mackintosh worked as a consultant historian for Heritage New Zealand Pouhere Taonga. In the late-2000s, Mackintosh lived in New Haven, Connecticut for two years. She worked with Alexander Nemerov, who later became an advisor for her doctoral studies.

Mackintosh undertook research for her PhD from 2013 to 2018. In 2019, Mackintosh received her PhD from the University of Auckland for her thesis, Shifting Grounds: History, Memory and Materiality in Auckland Landscapes c.1350–2018. The thesis was turned into an acclaimed book, published in 2021 as Shifting Grounds: Deep Histories of Tāmaki Makaurau Auckland. The book won the Ernest Scott Prize in 2022. One of her thesis supervisors, Anne Salmond, won the same prize in 1991 and 1998.

In 2019, Mackintosh wrote an article for The Guardian on Auckland's Ihumātao when a land occupation protesting against a planned housing development, was served an eviction notice and police intervened, exposing New Zealanders to its little-known history.

In 2020, Mackintosh, and fellow curator Nina Finigan, preserved objects of significance to Aucklanders' reaction to the COVID-19 pandemic at Auckland Museum.

== Personal life ==
Mackintosh's partner is Ben Lawrence. She has two children.

== Bibliography ==
- MacKintosh, Lucy (15 November 2021), Shifting Grounds: Deep Histories of Tāmaki Makaurau Auckland, Bridget Williams Books, OCLC 1290439618, OL 32138175W, Wikidata Q111908934
