= Caroline Daley =

New Zealand social and cultural historian

Academic background
- Education: Victoria University of Wellington
- Thesis: Gender in the community : a study of the women and men of the Taradale area, 1886-1930 (1992)
- Doctoral advisor: Jock Phillips

Academic work
- Institutions: University of Auckland
- Doctoral students: Lucy Mackintosh

Caroline Daley is a New Zealand social historian, and is a full professor of history at the University of Auckland. She is the dean of graduate studies at Auckland. Daley has appeared regularly on Radio New Zealand's show The Panel. She is interested in New Zealand social history, gender and body history, and the history of leisure.

== Academic career ==
Daley completed a Bachelor of Arts with Honours and a PhD titled Gender in the community: a study of the women and men of the Taradale area, 1886–1930 at Victoria University of Wellington. Daley then joined the faculty of the University of Auckland, rising to full professor in 2022. Daley is the Dean of Graduate Studies at Auckland.

Daley's research interests cover New Zealand social and cultural history, the history of the body and gender, and the history of leisure. She has published on the history of beauty pageants in New Zealand, as well as commented on current events relating to the politicisation of dress. Daley has published a number of books, including one from her PhD studies, which won the 2002 J. M. Sherrard Award in New Zealand Local and Regional History.

Daley has appeared multiple times on Radio New Zealand's show The Panel, and wrote the entry on the history of body shape and dieting in New Zealand for the Te Ara encyclopedia. She has co-edited the New Zealand Journal of History and was an editor of the Women's Studies Journal. In 2023 Daley was part of a delegation of University of Auckland researchers visiting Hohai University in China, to explore opportunities for join international graduate education.

One of Daley's notable graduate students is historian Lucy Mackintosh.

== Selected works ==
- Caroline Daley and Melanie Nolan (Eds). (1994) Suffrage and beyond: International feminist perspectives. Auckland: Auckland University Press. ISBN 978-0814718711
- Caroline Daley. (December 2003) Leisure & pleasure: reshaping & revealing the New Zealand body 1900–1960. Auckland University Press. ISBN 9781869402914
- Caroline Daley. (December 1999) Girls and women, men and boys: Gender in Taradale 1886–1930. Auckland University Press. ISBN 9781869402112
- Caroline Daley and Deborah Montgomerie. (December 1999) The Gendered Kiwi. Auckland University Press. ISBN 9781869402198
- Caroline Daley. (2008). Beauty Queens and Physique Kings: A History of New Zealand Beauty Contests. Auckland University Press. ISBN 9781869404208
- Caroline Daley (2005). The Invention of 1905, in Tackling Rugby Myths: Rugby and New Zealand Society 1854–2004. Editors: Greg Ryan. 69–87. University of Otago Press, Dunedin
- Caroline Daley (2005). "From bush to beach: nudism in Australasia". Journal of Historical Geography. 31 (1): 149–167. doi:10.1016/j.jhg.2004.03.020. Wikidata Q55897944.
- Caroline Daley (2002). "The strongman of eugenics, Eugen Sandow". Australian Historical Studies. 33 (120): 233–248. doi:10.1080/10314610208596217. Wikidata Q58341557.
- Caroline Daley (1998). ""He would know, but i just have a feeling": gender and oral history 1". Women's History Review. 7 (3): 343–359. doi:10.1080/09612029800200173. Wikidata Q126078737.
