= Erik Olssen =

New Zealand historian (1941–2026)

Erik Olssen ONZM FRSNZ
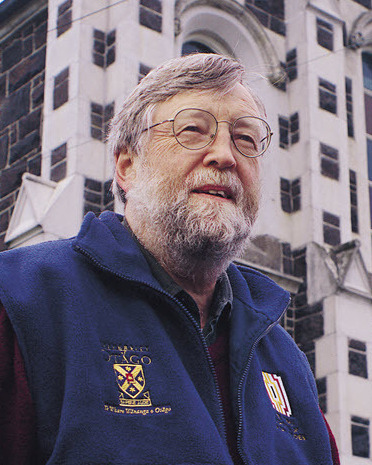
- Olssen in 2002
- Born: 14 December 1941; Hamilton, New Zealand
- Died: 29 July 2026 (aged 84)
- Title: Emeritus Professor

Academic background
- Education: Duke University
- Thesis: Dissent from normalcy: progressives in Congress, 1918–1925 (1970)

Academic work
- Discipline: History
- Sub-discipline: Labour and social history of New Zealand; History of Otago
- Institutions: University of Otago
- Notable works: John A. Lee (1977); A History of Otago (1983); The Red Feds : Revolutionary Industrial Unionism and the New Zealand Federation of Labour 1908–14 (1988); Building the New World: Work, Politics and Society in Caversham 1880s–1920s (1995)
- Notable ideas: Relationships between politics, society, ideas, culture, and economics shape the lives of individuals and their societies

Erik Newland Olssen ONZM FRSNZ (14 December 1941 – 29 July 2026) was a New Zealand historian whose research focused on the linkages between social structures, politics, and the world of ideas at four spatial domains – the local, provincial, national and global. His early research examined labour history, especially the working-class mobilisation in New Zealand from 1880 to 1940 and included a study of Caversham, regarded as one of the most industrialised areas of New Zealand at that time. He published several articles and monographs, including a biography of John A. Lee, and a history of Otago. Olssen was an academic in the Department of History at the University of Otago from 1969 until his retirement in 2002, when he was conferred with the title of emeritus professor.

== Early life, education and career ==
Olssen was born in Hamilton on 14 December 1941. He was educated at King's High School in Dunedin from 1955 to 1960, being inducted into the school's Hall of Fame in 2021. In 1964 Olssen graduated from the University of Otago with a Bachelor of Arts and with Master of Arts (1st Class Honours) in 1965, both in history and political science. His master's thesis, John Alexander Lee: the stormy petrel: his ideas, their inspiration and influence and his attempts to translate his ideas into legislation, was completed in 1965. After five years at Duke University, he completed a doctorate, a study of Dissent from Normalcy: Congressional Progressivism, 1918–25 and was awarded his PhD in 1970. While at Duke he also took several papers in sociology and spent a period in 1967 at a summer school at Cornell, funded by the Mathematical Association of America to study the relevance of mathematics and statistics to various historical issues. At Duke, he met and married the socialist feminist historian Andrée Lévesque, with whom he returned to New Zealand.

In 1969, Olssen was recruited to the University of Otago as a lecturer by the head of history, Angus Ross. He was promoted to associate professor in 1978, and to a personal chair in 1984. He was head of the Department of History from 1989 to 1993 and 2000 to 2002. On his retirement in 2002 he was appointed emeritus professor.

== Development and impact as a social historian ==
Olssen's father was a historian and a socialist, who instilled in him a respect for evidence-based scholarship. Olssen became interested in labour politics in the 1970 and 1980s because he felt socialism offered a way toward justice and equality in New Zealand. His involvement in the working-class Caversham branch of the Labour Party allowed him to study the development and mobilisation of a working-class community.

His work on John A. Lee as the subject of his thesis showed Olssen there was little historiography related to the development of socialism in New Zealand at the time/ At Cornell in 1967 Olssen studied the new social history through the lens of "economics, statistics, game theory, [and] sociology", crediting this time as being influential in his development as a social historian able to write the history of ordinary people. On his return to New Zealand, much of Olssen's research explored the development of social structures in the country from the early nineteenth century until 1940, specifically examining how "politics, society, ideas, culture, and economics [affected] the lives of individuals and their societies". In Jock Phillip's opinion, Olssen pioneered this focus on social history that explored class and social relationships. According to Tony Ballantyne and Brian Moloughney from the University of Otago, Olssen's work significantly shaped understandings of "New Zealand's political traditions, intellectual culture and social formations".

Towards a History of the European Family in New Zealand co-authored by Olssen in 1978, was seen by two New Zealand historians Bronwyn Labrum and Bronwyn Dalley as being influential in shifting the historiography of New Zealand toward more of a "social historical approach". In acknowledging that comment, Olssen explained that the article had resulted from him coming into contact with feminism because research by his co-author Andrée Lévesque into women's history had uncovered much that was unrecognised. He said it was timely to draw on work he had done in the U.S. to write about the impact of the family historically in New Zealand. In 1978, when Olssen wrote an essay in The Gendered Kiwi , one writer stated that it indicated a shift in position by Olssen toward recognising the need for further research into the family as a primary site where gender is constructed.

In 2008 the New Zealand media published a claim by John Stenhouse, an associate professor at the University of Otago that the country's history was being distorted by "secular and left-liberal" historians, such as Olssen and Keith Sinclair to push their own agendas. Olssen called the claim "either unfair or disingenuous or both" but noted that he had often discussed whether New Zealand was a Christian country with the associate professor and there was some agreement that Christianity had influenced in shaping the values of New Zealand. In an earlier piece Stenhouse had critiqued New Zealand historiography and religion and developed a "secularization thesis", citing as an example Olssen's position that Edward Gibbon Wakefield's social experiment in New Zealand "left little room for religion". In the same article, Stenhouse contended that Olssen's work with Andrée Lévesque in 1978 on the development of the European family in New Zealand, reflected "second wave feminist antipathy toward patriarchy" when they portrayed the churches and clergy in Otago as providing justification for the patriarchal values in the family, community and wider New Zealand society.

== National history ==
Olssen's book The Origins of an Experimental Society: New Zealand 1769-1860 was published in May 2025. In the introduction Olssen states: "Many histories have been written about the European colonisation of New Zealand, but this one looks in depth and detail at the particular intellectual and political belief systems of the Europeans at that historical moment; at the ways the Pacific in turn influenced their ideas about human nature and human history; and how those ideas shaped the interconnected history of these two peoples." Claudia Orange situates the book as an argument for the settlement of New Zealand as "a series of 'experiments'...[that tracks]...the ideas, philosophies and values which were carried in settlers' baggage, the early inter-connectedness between Māori and the newcomers that reshaped those experiments, and the profound significance of these decades for the future of the country and its peoples." Buddy Mikaere, Ex Director of the Waitangi Tribunal said he found the book "stunning, breathtaking even, in its scope and detail", and on the same website Atholl Anderson from the Australian National University described it as "remarkably lucid and insightful on a broad front of historical scholarship". Philip Temple concluded that the book [was]: "Free of presentism and bias, it blows a fresh wind through the clichés of our history that bedevil current discourse. It is a must-read for anyone who truly seeks to understand our history, of the complexities involved in the foundation years of who we were to become."

== Provincial history: Otago 1800–1920 ==
In his study of Otago, Olssen explored the history of the province from the relationships between Māori and colonists from Britain that, in the early nineteenth century, resulted in a culturally-respectful regional settlement with a provincial identity, through its development as a centre in which skilled and unskilled workers became active in advocating for improved working conditions and consolidated the unionised working class as a potential political influence. One reviewer said this interpretation of the development of a working class by Olssen was significant because it situated him in later writings as a historian with the position that class was important in the political development of New Zealand. The history also explored the influence of the rise of Darwinian biology that challenged the biblical view of creation and developed intellectual credibility at the University of Otago where agnosticism and scientific methodology were valued resulting in the work of Dr Fredrick Truby King and the establishment of the Plunket Society.

== Local history: the Caversham project ==
From 1975 unti 2001, Olssen was Principal Investigator of a project which measured the historical social movement of different categories of people and their related geographic mobility in one borough. Caversham, a suburb of Dunedin, was chosen as the study area because of the availability of electoral rolls and population data from the Census.

Olssen had studied similar topics during his PhD studies. Jock Phillips said that Olssen's work in Caversham was significant during a time when historians were studying social history in the country.

The project was featured in a 2002 exhibition created by staff of the Otago Settlers Museum with the Caversham Project Team.

== Death ==
Olssen died on 29 July 2026, at the age of 84.

== Publications ==
The Skilled Workers: Journeymen and Masters in Caversham, 1880–1914 (1988). Judi Boyd and Olssen published the first systematic study of mobility in the New Zealand Journal of History. It investigated the role played by skilled workers in the process of class formation and how this shaped later political developments in New Zealand.

The Power of the Shop Culture: The Labour Process in the New Zealand Railway Workshops 1890–1930 (1992). Olssen's research with Jeremy Brecher into the building and engineering trades at Hillside Engineering challenged the idea that large-scale industry inevitably reduced skilled workers' agency, showing that they enjoyed and maintained almost complete control over the labour process, [and] that "their skill...gave them a sense of identity and pride".

Building the New World: work, politics and society in Caversham, 1880s–1920s (1995). This book arising from the Caversham Project represented a change in focus for Olssen from unskilled to skilled workers at a local rather than a national level. One academic reviewer held that Olssen's acquaintance with feminist and post-modern theory positioned him to analyse the role of women in work, politics and society. She did question whether some of the strong statements made by Olssen about perceptions of women at the time added value to the study, suggesting the evidence be reconsidered to ascertain if data exclusions could "point to inclusions and alternative meanings". Another suggested that Olssen's study was significant for tracing the process by which the women of the Caversham community were enabled to gain skilled training and more independence.

Sites of Gender: Women, Men & Modernity in Southern Dunedin, 1890–1939 (2003). This book was created by a larger multidisciplinary team that Olssen assembled in the late 1990s to analyse women's experience and the role of gender in structuring society. In his chapter, Olssen took the position that the mobilisation of the workforce in the 1880s had many egalitarian aspects including the formation of some of the first women's unions, and women became increasingly confident and independent. The book placed gender at the centre of an analysis of work in Caversham; Olssen's contribution was a meta-narrative which stressed the "change and continuities of gendering in work."

Class, Gender and the Vote (2005). A collaboration between some members of the team and Miles Fairburn's group at the University of Canterbury. Co-editor Olssen's chapter Marriage Patterns in Dunedin's Southern Suburbs, 1881–1938 explored the decisions young women made around work and marriage, saying they were influenced by higher levels of education and more awareness of debates and movements in the wider world related to women's rights.

Class and Occupation: The New Zealand Reality (2005). A specialist book in the field of demographics and census data.

An Accidental Utopia? Social Mobility and the Foundations of an Egalitarian Society, 1880–1940 (2010). Olssen co-authored this fourth book published by the Caversham Project. An Otago Daily Times reviewer noted Olssen's radicalism and "socialist aspirations" but debated whether or not the book answered the question in its title.

Movement and Persistence: A Case Study of Southern Dunedin in Global Context (2011). A paper for Building Attachment in Families (2011), a Centre for Research, Evaluation and Social Assessment (CRESA) project that sought to identify how communities are built and sustained to create family wellbeing and manage problems of transience. Olssen's data confirmed high fluidity and social mixing of the suburb's population.

Working Lives c.1900 A Photographic Essay was launched in 2014 by Dave Cull . One reviewer said that while Olssen invited the reader "to engage with both the richness and limitations of the photographers' gaze", a lack of images related to "household work or child-raising; work-place injuries and ill-health" portrayed a narrow definition of work. Olssen said that in the 1870s and 80s "the values and habits of life that evolved among the working men and women" in Dunedin were also reflected nationally., He suggested that the formation of the first women's union and the general acceptance by middle-class people for unions led to the development of an independent Labour Party in New Zealand.

== Demographics ==
Olssen was on the Steering Panel for the Royal Society's Our Futures Te Pae Tāwhiti The 2013 census and New Zealand's changing population 2014 paper. He said the 2013 Census showed an imbalance with Auckland growing at a much faster rate than some other regions, particularly rural areas. He cautioned that the imbalance contributed toward feelings of resentment, and that ratepayers in areas with less growth could struggle to financially maintain infrastructure for an ageing and possibly dwindling population.

In a follow-up Health sub report (2015), Olssen discussed demographic trends in mortality, morbidity, and fertility in New Zealand, evaluated health services and explored the determinants of health.

== Further journal articles ==
- Mr Wakefield and New Zealand as an Experiment in Post-Enlightenment Experimental Practice (1997).
- Where to From Here? Reflections on the Twentieth-Century Historiography of Nineteenth-Century New Zealand (1992). Historian Giselle Byrnes, noted in the New Oxford Dictionary (2009) that in the paper, Olssen made "a strong case for more local studies to show variance within generalised histories".
- Truby King and the Plunket Society: An Analysis of a Prescriptive Ideology (1981).
- The Working Class in New Zealand (1974).

== Book reviews and media contributions ==
- A peculiarly contemporary figure (1991). Olssen reviewed two books written by K.R. Howe about Edward Tregear, a significant contributor to New Zealand's social and political history during the 1880s.
- Self-reliant in Victorian New Zealand (1995). A review of Nearly Out of Hope and Heart: The puzzle of a colonial labourer's Diary.
- Public postures, private lives (1999). Review of books about two significant members of the New Zealand labour movement, James Edwards and Jock Barnes
- Tribute to Michael King (2004).
- The New Zealand Family from 1840: A Demographic History (2008).
- Recalling Dunedin's dark days (2008). In an interview to reconsider the effect of the Great Depression on New Zealand, Olssen claimed it was mainly caused by the central Government retrenching to cut spending and borrowing resulting in high levels of unemployment, for which little responsibility was taken leaving it to "local communities...to provide soup kitchens and depots for food, clothing and coal". Olssen noted that even after the passing of the Unemployment Act (1930), the Dunedin City Council and the Otago Hospital Board took most of the responsibility for supporting the unemployed.
- Graduates facing 'greater challenges (2012). In a 2012 graduation speech at the University of Otago, Olssen highlighted the differences in the world at the time from when he was a student fifty years previously.
- Hillary stands atop summit of NZ fame (2013). In 2013, sixty years after Edmund Hillary had conquered Mount Everest, Olssen contributed to the discussion about how the mountaineer ranked among New Zealand's heroes.
- What we need is a melting pot (2015).
- Simplicity compounds ignorance (2019).
- History in the making: the battle over the new school curriculum(2021).

== Offices held ==
- Trustee of the Turnbull Endowment Trust from 1986; member of the Special Committee Alexander Turnbull
- Fellow of the New Zealand Academy of the Humanities (2008)
- Fellow of the Hocken Library (2007)
- Member of Cultural Heritage Advisory Group (2006)
- Distinguished Fulbright Fellow (2004)
- Chair of the Humanities and Peer Review Law Panel for the first round of the Performance Based Research Fund 2003.
- James Cook Research Fellow (2001)
- Fellow of the Royal Society of New Zealand (1998)
- Advisory Committee for the Dictionary of New Zealand Biography (1983–1996)
- Dunedin City Council Sesquicentennial Publications Committee (1995–1998)
- Member Social Science Advisory Committee of Foundation for Research, Science & Technology (1997–2000)
- Member Otago Goldfields Park Advisory Committee (1977–1984)
- History Curriculum Committee (1983–1988)

== Honours and awards ==
In the 2002 Queen's Birthday and Golden Jubilee Honours, Olssen was appointed an Officer of the New Zealand Order of Merit, for services to historical research.

Olssen received the Te Rangi Hiroa Medal in 2001.

Olssen's publication Building the New World: work, politics and society in Caversham, 1880s–1920s, won the J.E. Sherrard Prize, 1996.

In 1978 Olssen's book John A. Lee was runner-up in the Goodman Fielder Wattie Book Awards.

The Erik Olssen Prize, named in recognition of Olssen's work as a historian, is awarded biennially by the New Zealand Historical Association, for the best first book by an author on any aspect of New Zealand history.

== See also ==
- Military history of New Zealand during World War I
