= Mount Maunganui College =

Location
- Maunganui Road; Mount Maunganui Tauranga 3116; New Zealand; 37.6619°S 176.2071°E

Information
- Type: State, Co-educational, Secondary (Year 9–13)
- Motto: Latin: Sapientia Carior Auro "Wisdom is More Precious Than Gold" "No Choice But Success"
- Established: 1958
- Ministry of Education Institution no.: 118
- Principal: Alastair Sinton
- Enrolment: 1,756 (July 2026)
- Socio-economic decile: 6N
- Website: mmc.school.nz

Mount Maunganui College is a state coeducational secondary school and is located in Tauranga, New Zealand. It was established in 1958, the same year that Tauranga College was split into Tauranga Boys' College and Tauranga Girls' College. There is also a Māori wharenui located on the ground.

== Enrolment ==
As of July 2026, Mount Maunganui College has roll of 1,756 students, of which 522 (29.7%) identify as Māori.

As of 2026, the school has an Equity Index of 452, placing it amongst schools whose students have average socioeconomic barriers to achievement (roughly equivalent to deciles 5 and 6 under the former socio-economic decile system).

== Achievements ==
In the years 2000, 2005, 2007, 2010 and 2013, Mount Maunganui College competed in the Auckland Stage Challenge competition and won. The 2010 performance also won National Stage Challenge competition.

== Sport ==
Mount Maunganui College offers a wide range of winter and summer sports, including Athletics, Badminton, Cricket, Cross Country, Golf, Mountain Biking, Hockey, Rugby, Waterpolo and Table Tennis. While fostering the achievements of many higher level sports players the school places particular emphasis on involvement and participation. Highlights of the sporting calendar include the regional sporting tournament week, schoolwide running, swimming and athletics events and an annual sports exchange program with Lynfield College in Auckland.

The college has a gym and a fitness centre, a 33-metre outdoor swimming pool, a basketball court, a large sports field and several netball and tennis courts.

== Houses ==
Mount Maunganui College has 4 houses all named after birds.

- Ruru or Morepork (green)
- Takahē (yellow)
- Huia (extinct bird) (blue)
- Kotuku or White Heron (white)

== School safety ==
Tauranga City Council received many complaints concerning the speed limit of the main road outside of the school. However following the death of a student crossing the road in 2008, and subsequent uproar from the community and students, significant changes were made including the reduction of the speed limit from 70 to 50 km/h.

== Notable alumni ==
- Melanie Nolan – historian
- Scott Robertson – rugby union player and coach
- Eddie Stokes – rugby union player
- Jessica Rose – actress
- Jeroen Speak – composer
- Steve Braunias – author, columnist, journalist and editor
- Joel Shadbolt – singer
- Dirk Williams – rugby union player
