= Dirk Williams =

New Zealand-born Australian rugby union player (born 1961)

- Full name: Dirk Antony Williams
- Born: 31 March 1961 (age 65) Tauranga, New Zealand
- School: Mount Maunganui College
- University: University of Otago; RMIT University
- Occupation: Chiropractor

Rugby union career
- Position: Flanker
Provincial / State sides
Years	Team	Apps	(Points)
1980–82	Otago	28	(8)
1984–88	Wellington	68	(80)
International career
Years	Team	Apps	(Points)
1996	Australia		

Dirk Antony Williams (born 31 March 1961) is a New Zealand-born Australian former rugby union player.

Born in Tauranga, Williams was educated at Mount Maunganui College, where he had four years in the 1st XV. He was a New Zealand Schools and New Zealand U-21s representative. While attending the University of Otago, Williams played provincial rugby with Otago, then switched to Wellington after returning north for further studies.

Williams, an openside flanker, undertook a tour of the United Kingdom with the New Zealand Barbarians in 1987 and the following year had a stint with London club Harlequins. He moved to Melbourne in 1989 to study at RMIT and played for the city's Harlequin Rugby Club. In 1990, Williams was state captain for Victoria.

With the 1991 Rugby World Cup looming, Williams linked up with Sydney club Eastern Suburbs in an attempt to make the squad, then returned to Melbourne when he didn't receive a call up.

Williams worked as a Sydney Swans conditioning coach and was at the SCG in 1996 when New South Wales needed a last-minute replacement for a match against Wales at the nearby Sydney Football Stadium, enabling him to make his Waratahs debut. He was in his second stint at Eastern Suburbs and won the 1996 AAMI Medal as the Sydney first-grade player of the year, finishing one vote ahead of Eastwood's Nathan Spooner.

A Wallabies conditioning coach on their 1996 end of year tour of Europe, a 35-year old Williams was required to take the field in a tour match against Combined Scottish Districts at McDiarmid Park, with the squad having been depleted by a series of injuries. He scored the Wallabies' opening try in a 25–9 win.
