= Caversham, New Zealand =

Suburb of Dunedin, New Zealand

Caversham
- Suburb
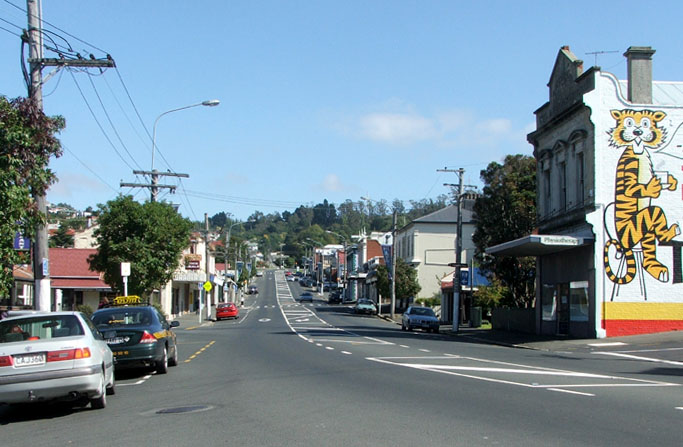
- South Road, Caversham, looking west towards the start of the Caversham Valley
- Interactive map of Caversham
- Coordinates: 45°54′S 170°29′E
- Country: New Zealand
- City: Dunedin
- Established: 1850s

Area
  - Land: 71 ha (180 acres)

Population (June 2025)
  - Total: 2,320
  - Density: 3,300/km^{2} (8,500/sq mi)

Balaclava	Maryhill	Mornington
Lookout Point	Caversham	Kensington
Calton Hill	Forbury, Kew	South Dunedin

Caversham /ˈkævərʃəm/ is one of the older suburbs (neighbourhoods) of the city of Dunedin, in New Zealand's South Island. It is sited at the western edge of the city's central plain at the mouth of the steep Caversham Valley, which rises to the saddle of Lookout Point. Major road and rail routes south lie nearby; the South Island Main Trunk railway runs through the suburb, and a bypass skirts its main retail area, connecting Dunedin's one-way street system with the Dunedin Southern Motorway. The suburb is linked by several bus routes to its neighbouring suburbs and central Dunedin.

The suburb was founded by wealthy pioneer William Henry Valpy, and its name reflects his family connections with the town of Reading, in the English county of Berkshire. Caversham grew rapidly during the Otago gold rush of the 1860s because of its location on routes south to the Otago hinterland. By the end of the 19th century, Caversham was heavily industrialised, and its population included many skilled or semi-skilled tradespeople. This, combined with the community's strong Protestant roots, led to the area's generally left-leaning political stance. Caversham's early history has been the subject of the Caversham Project, a major historical and archaeological study by the University of Otago. Caversham was a separate borough until 1904, when it was amalgamated with Dunedin city. At a national level, it is part of the Taieri electorate.

Caversham is now predominantly residential, with some industrial premises in the east (notably the Hillside Railway Workshops) and a retail district centred on South Road and Hillside Road. Residents are generally of low socio-economic status. Caversham's notable buildings include the heritage listed Lisburn House and several prominent church buildings. Another landmark is the suburb's war memorial, which is the main gate of Caversham School, the suburb's primary school. Caversham also contains a special-needs school. The nearest secondary schools operate in St Clair, 1 kilometre (0.62 mi) to the south.

Caversham has strong sporting connections, and is the location of Carisbrook, until 2011 one of Dunedin's main sports venues. The suburb is home to the Southern Rugby Football Club, and gives its name to Caversham Football Club. Several notable sportspeople have associations with Caversham, among them Test cricketer Clarrie Grimmett and father and son rugby union administrators "Old Vic" and "Young Vic" Cavanagh. Other notable people with Caversham connections include politician Thomas Kay Sidey, architect Edmund Anscombe, and surveyor John Turnbull Thomson.

== Geography ==
Caversham lies at the mouth and in the lower reaches of a valley in the west of Dunedin's main urban area, 4 kilometres (2.5 mi) southwest of the city centre, and 2 kilometres (1.2 mi) north of the Pacific coast at St Clair. To the south lies Calton Hill, a spur of Forbury Hill, on which the suburbs of Calton Hill, Corstorphine and Kew are located.

The suburbs of Balaclava and Maryhill lie to the north, close to the western end of the ridge that runs along the northern edge of central Dunedin. These hills were all once part of the rim of the Dunedin volcano, the long-extinct crater of which now forms Otago Harbour. Other suburbs nearby include Forbury, South Dunedin, Kensington, and Lookout Point.

Caversham Valley has long been the major route out of the central city to the south. The suburb is located close to the start of the Dunedin Southern Motorway (part of State Highway 1), the main road access to central Dunedin from the south, and close to the South Island Main Trunk railway. The creation of the Dunedin Southern Motorway redirected traffic away from South Road, the main thoroughfare through Caversham.

The railway provides the suburb's most important industry, through the Hillside Railway Workshops, which are located in the southeast of the suburb and in the adjoining suburb of South Dunedin. Despite this, there are no longer any public railway stations or halts in Caversham, the last station having closed in 1962.

The hill slopes to the north of Caversham are less densely populated, and still retain some tree cover. This, along with the steepness of the land, forms a natural barrier between Caversham and the suburb of Maryhill. Only a few winding roads traverse this barrier, most notably Glen Road, at the eastern end of Caversham. At this end, the suburb draws close to the foot of the hills, and a natural valley, known locally as "The Glen", provides easier road access to the hill ridge.

To the northeast of the Glen, a hill spur including a 20-metre (66 ft) cliff separates Caversham from the central part of the city. Though the name is rarely used, this spur is called Montecillo Ridge, named for the mansion of early settler W.H. Reynolds. It is occasionally referred to as "Hillside", after the house of the city's founding father Captain William Cargill which was located here. This ridge overlooks "The Flat", as the plain stretching across to the Pacific coast was (and is still) locally known. South Road winds around the spur, connecting with the southern end of Princes Street. One of the city's older and more historic cemeteries, Dunedin Southern Cemetery, lies on the inner city side of this spur.

=== Lookout Point ===
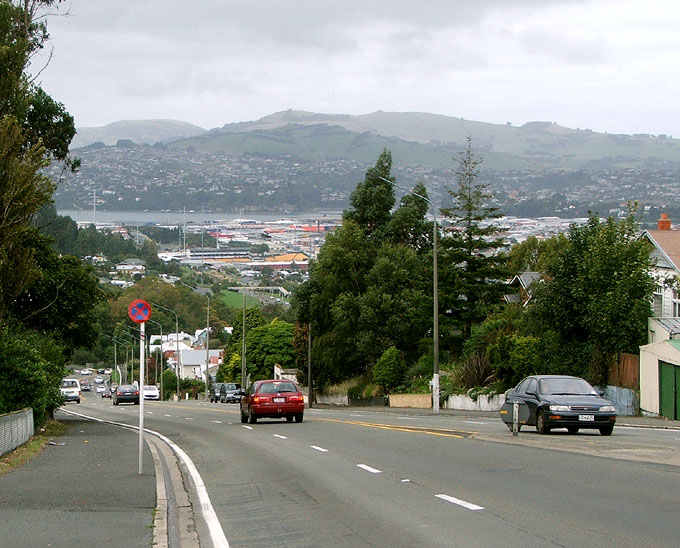
From Lookout Point, Caversham Valley Road descends rapidly. This image shows the view east across South Dunedin to Otago Harbour, with Otago Peninsula in the background.

At the top of Caversham Valley are a ridge and the saddle of Lookout Point. Lookout Point commands views to the southwest past the outer suburbs of Burnside and Green Island to Saddle Hill, as well as providing a view to the east across the southern part of the central city to Otago Harbour and the Otago Peninsula.

The most prominent building in Lookout Point is the local fire station, which also serves both Caversham and Green Island. This 1956 structure is located immediately to the north of the saddle and is a prominent landmark upon entering or leaving Dunedin. Not far from the fire station to the north-east is Dunedin's tallest tree, a eucalyptus measuring an estimated 100 metres. The Dunedin Southern Motorway officially begins at the Lookout Point saddle, between Calton Hill and Maryhill, and sweeps down over broken hill country past Green Island to Mosgiel and the Taieri Plains.

Lookout Point is also the home of the former Caversham Industrial School, located to the northeast of the fire station on Mornington Road. Established in 1869, the school was later a boys' home, and is now an adult training centre. Lookout Point's main streets include South Road, Caversham Valley Road, Riselaw Road, and Mornington Road. A major flyover was constructed at Lookout Point in the early 2000s, allowing routes to the suburbs of Corstorphine and Maryhill to connect without having to negotiate a junction with the start of the Dunedin Southern Motorway.

The Māori name for Lookout Point is Ko Raka-a-runga-te-raki. It was the burial site of chief Rangi-Ihia, a late 18th-century Kāti Māmoe chief who was largely responsible for joining the Kāi Tahu and Kāti Māmoe iwi. He was buried here so that "his spirit might see thence his old haunts to the southward."

A 3.4-hectare (8.4-acre) forest reserve is located on the upper slopes of Caversham Valley below Lookout Point. Purchased by the Dunedin City Council in 1994 with the assistance of the Royal Forest and Bird Protection Society, it is home to various native bird and invertebrate species, including one species of velvet worm (Peripatoides otepoti) believed to be endemic to the Dunedin area.

== History ==
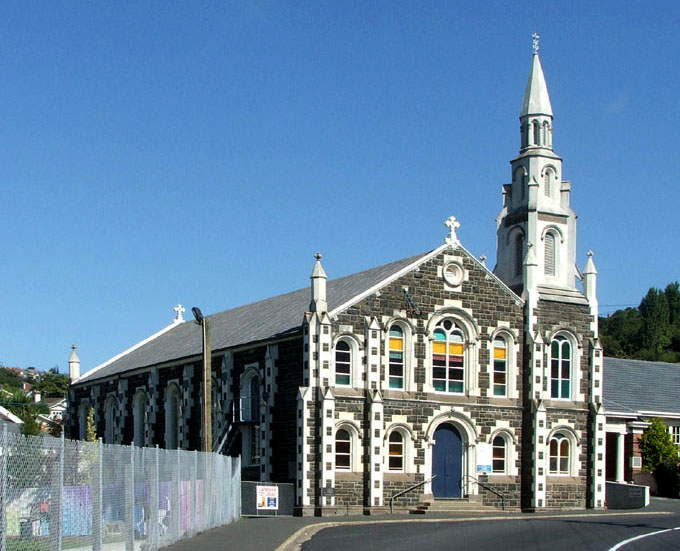
Caversham Presbyterian Church

Caversham was named for Caversham, Berkshire, a suburb of Reading, by William Henry Valpy, a wealthy early settler who farmed the areas around the lower slopes of Forbury Hill; his initial farm, "The Forbury", was located in what is now St Clair, close to a street which now bears his name. A member of Valpy's family was born in the English Caversham.

In the early days of Dunedin, it was impossible for a dray to reach the Caversham Valley in wet weather unless it went by a circuitous route around the hills. Valpy solved this problem by hiring men at his own expense to build a crude road from the southern end of Princes Street to his farm at Forbury. This formed the basis for later roads into the suburb. The road curved around the edge of the hills at the Glen to avoid a large swamp, the site of which was occupied by Carisbrook sports ground until 2011.

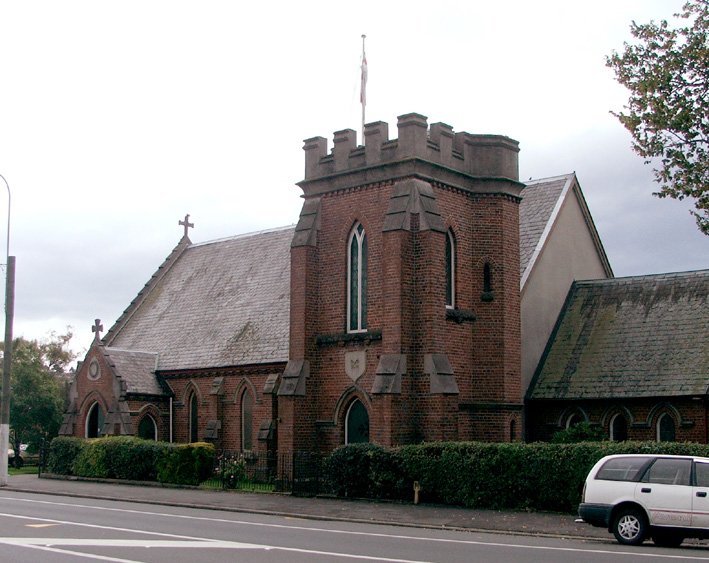
St. Peter's Anglican Church, Hillside Road

Settlement in the area was slow, though Caversham Valley was a preferred route south out of the city. The Otago gold rush of 1861 led to rapid changes when thousands of people began using the road on their way to and from the gold fields. The suburb began to expand rapidly at about this time, and the first public house, the Edinburgh Castle Hotel, was erected in 1861. By the end of the decade, Caversham had its own school, post office, drill hall (from the Southern District Rifles), and Anglican and Presbyterian churches. A third church, for the Baptist denomination, followed in 1872.

Several charitable organisations have had properties in Caversham, including the Otago Benevolent Institution home for invalids, and an IHC New Zealand centre at Kew Park. The Royal New Zealand Foundation of the Blind still has its Otago premises in Hillside Road.

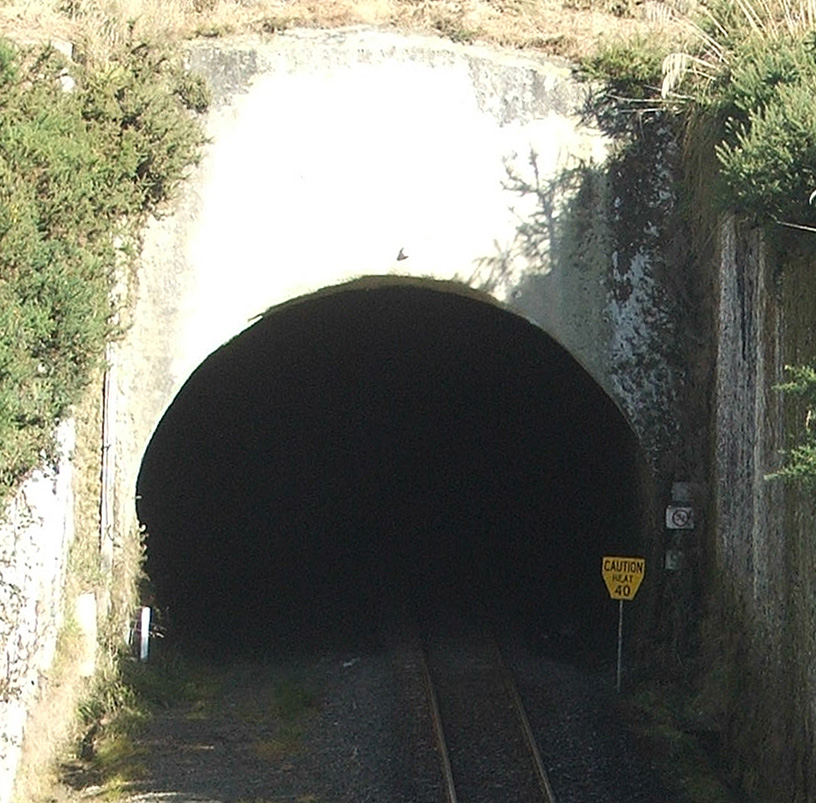
Caversham rail tunnel was designed for twin tracks but is now only used by one.

Early industries in the area included C & W Sheil's brickworks, which had quarries in Forbury, St Clair and Caversham, and Caversham Gasworks, which operated from 1882 until 1909. The last buildings of the gasworks were a local landmark, and were not removed until the construction of the Caversham bypass in the 1970s and 1980s. Other noted industries in early Caversham included breweries, a tannery, and a match factory.

Construction of the South Island Main Trunk railway south of Dunedin that began in 1871 led to the construction of an 865-metre (2,838 ft) tunnel beneath Lookout Point, connecting Caversham with Green Island. A second parallel 1,407-metre (4,616 ft) tunnel – the first double-track tunnel in the country – was built starting in 1907, and all rail traffic moved to the new tunnel in 1910. Caversham was served by its own railway station until its closure in 1962. There has been a long-running campaign to have the older tunnel converted into a cycleway, though this scheme has never gained wholehearted council support.

By the 1870s the population of Caversham was growing rapidly, and in 1877, with the population at around 4,000, it was declared a borough. It held this status until amalgamation with Dunedin city in 1904. The borough's area included much of modern Forbury and St Clair, as well as what is usually regarded as Caversham today.

=== Caversham Project ===
The early history of the suburb and surrounding parts of southern Dunedin has been the subject of a major ongoing archaeological and historical research project into early Dunedin by the University of Otago, known simply as The Caversham Project. Over the course of the last 30 years, a database has been compiled of life in early South Dunedin, focussing on the borough of Caversham. This database is unique in its size for a historical study within New Zealand or Australia, and has allowed for the examination and publication of details relating to the socioeconomic and demographic mix of early Dunedin.

The multidisciplinary nature of the study has resulted in information being gathered on subjects ranging from urban planning to gender studies. By using both quantitative and qualitative analyses, and by including considerable amounts of oral history, it has allowed for a vivid recreation of the society of early urban New Zealand. Several books have resulted from the project, among them Sites of Gender: Women, Men and Modernity, 1890–1939, edited by B. Brookes, A. Cooper, and R. Law (Auckland University Press, 2003) and Class and Occupation: The New Zealand Reality by E. Olssen and M. Hickey (University of Otago Press, 2005).

In 2002, an exhibition at the Otago Settlers Museum acknowledged the project.

== Governance ==
In its formative days, the Caversham Road Board administered Caversham. This organisation served as a council for Caversham until May 1877, when it became a borough. The borough of Caversham, which existed until November 1904, took in a far larger area than the current suburb, including much of Saint Clair, South Dunedin, Kew, and Kensington, and stretched to the Pacific coast in the south and Otago Harbour in the east. The names of several of the borough's mayors are commemorated in streets within the former borough, among them Robert Rutherford, William Bridgman, and Thomas Kay Sidey.

The Dunedin City Council currently administers Caversham.

At a national level, Caversham was a separate electorate from 1866 to 1908. MPs for the electorate included Thomas Kay Sidey and future Premier Robert Stout. Since 1908 Caversham has been in various electorates, and is currently part of the Taieri electorate. As of 2026, its MP is Ingrid Leary (Labour).

== Demographics ==
Unlike most of Dunedin, which was settled by Scots, many early settlers in Caversham were English. This led to some degree of antagonism by the councils of the city and Caversham borough in the early days of settlement; Dunedin had been settled by the Presbyterian church, whereas Caversham's population was largely Anglican, Methodist, and Baptist. There is little evidence of this distinction in modern Caversham, other than the origins of local street names, several of which reflect the names of English counties and early English settlers.

Caversham began largely as a lower-middle to working-class suburb. Many of the early residents were skilled or semi-skilled tradespeople. In its early days, Caversham was known as "The carpenters' borough", as a high proportion of the skilled workers within the borough were employed in the building trade. The socioeconomic mix of the borough, combined with the Protestant religious make-up of Caversham, led to strong traditions of egalitarian and social humanitarian politics in the borough.

The left-leaning politics of the area is still reflected to some extent in local political views. The Taieri electorate and its predecessor Dunedin South, of which Caversham is a part, tends to return New Zealand Labour Party Members of Parliament and support this and other left-of-centre parties.

Many residents of Caversham are still of relatively low socio-economic status when compared to those in surrounding hill suburbs. A 2007 Dunedin City Council report indicated that a high proportion (39%) of the suburb's houses were one- or two-bedroom dwellings.

The 2023 Caversham statistical area covers 0.71 km^{2} (0.27 sq mi) and had an estimated population of 2,320 as of June 2025, with a population density of 3,268 people per km^{2}.

Historical population
Year	Pop.	±% p.a.
2006	2,253	—
2013	2,181	−0.46%
2018	2,265	+0.76%

Caversham had a population of 2,265 at the 2018 New Zealand census, an increase of 84 people (3.9%) since the 2013 census, and an increase of 12 people (0.5%) since the 2006 census. There were 1,029 households, comprising 1,053 males and 1,212 females, giving a sex ratio of 0.87 males per female. The median age was 43.3 years (compared with 37.4 years nationally), with 315 people (13.9%) aged under 15 years, 459 (20.3%) aged 15 to 29, 927 (40.9%) aged 30 to 64, and 558 (24.6%) aged 65 or older.

Ethnicities were 81.3% European/Pākehā, 15.1% Māori, 7.4% Pasifika, 5.6% Asian, and 2.5% other ethnicities. People may identify with more than one ethnicity.

The percentage of people born overseas was 16.0, compared with 27.1% nationally.

Although some people chose not to answer the census's question about religious affiliation, 50.5% had no religion, 37.4% were Christian, 0.5% had Māori religious beliefs, 0.7% were Hindu, 0.7% were Muslim, 0.5% were Buddhist and 2.1% had other religions.

Of those at least 15 years old, 315 (16.2%) people had a bachelor's or higher degree, and 510 (26.2%) people had no formal qualifications. The median income was $23,400, compared with $31,800 nationally. 90 people (4.6%) earned over $70,000 compared to 17.2% nationally. The employment status of those at least 15 was that 762 (39.1%) people were employed full-time, 267 (13.7%) were part-time, and 99 (5.1%) were unemployed.

== Education ==
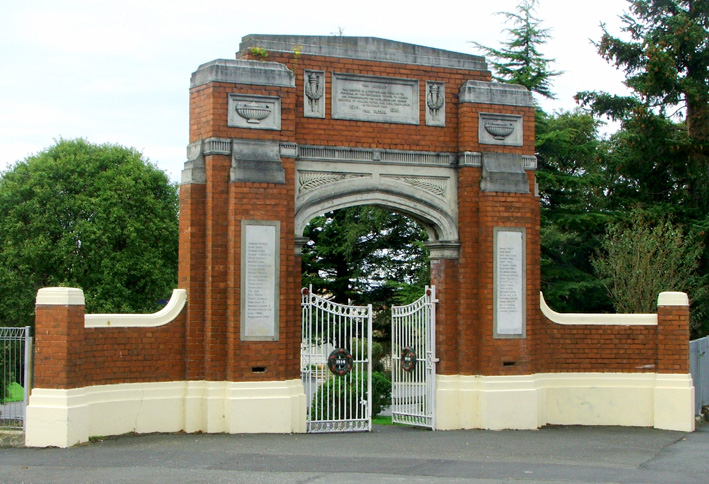
The gates of Caversham Primary School (now Carisbrook School) serve as the suburb's war memorial.

Caversham has no secondary schools, although it does contain a primary school and a special education school. Carisbrook School, at the corner of South Road and Surrey Street, was formed from a 2012 merger of Calton Hill School, Caversham School, and College Street School on the Caversham School site, which was established in 1921. The school's predecessor dates back to the early 1860s. The roll is 335 students as of July 2026. The school's two-storey 1920s brick buildings were pulled down and replaced in 1961, because of their structural unsoundness. The school's main gate – the only surviving remnant of the earlier structure – is the suburb's war memorial.

In 1926, the Sara Cohen School was established on Rutherford Street, catering to special needs pupils from primary school age through adulthood. The school was named for the late wife of Mark Cohen, city councillor, campaigner for women's rights, and editor of the Evening Star newspaper from 1893 to 1920. In 1889, Mark Cohen was a major figure behind the founding of New Zealand's first kindergarten. In 2025, the school moved to new grounds in nearby Calton Hill.

There are kindergartens and child-care centres in both Rutherford Street (by Kew Park) and South Road (to the east of the main retail area), and there are numerous pre-school facilities and further primary schools in the suburbs of Forbury and Saint Clair, immediately to the south of Caversham. The nearest secondary schools are the single-sex schools of Queen's High School and King's High School, located alongside each other close to the boundary between Saint Clair and South Dunedin, 1 kilometre (0.62 mi) to the south.

== Economy ==
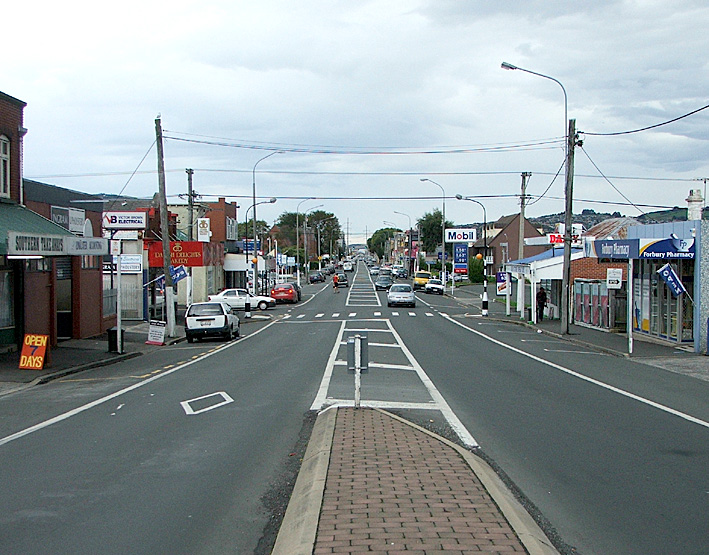
Hillside Road, looking east from Forbury Corner

In its early years, Caversham was heavily industrialised, but also contained a large number of residential properties. The population included a large number of skilled tradespeople and craftspeople, and both large and small industries abounded. Local industries at the beginning of the twentieth century included a brickworks, a gasworks, breweries, a smithy, milliners, several bakeries, a tannery, a bootmakers, and Rutherford's Wax Vesta match factory at Forbury Corner. In 1900, the South Road-David Street-Forbury Corner area was home to over 50 businesses.

Today, the suburb is mainly residential, though it has areas of retail and light industrial businesses. The main retail area is on South Road between the start of the rise up Caversham Valley and David Street, extending into David Street and the western end of Hillside Road (Forbury Corner, sometimes referred to as Kew Corner). A few shops are also located on South Road 0.8 kilometres (0.50 mi) to the east, near Carisbrook. Hillside Road becomes increasingly light industrial as it approaches South Dunedin, with automotive engineers, car sales yards, joineries, a rope factory, and a funeral parlour. One of Dunedin's largest industrial sites, the Hillside Railway Workshops, dominates the eastern end of Hillside Road, close to which lie other, smaller, industrial sites. Beyond this is the shopping precinct of South Dunedin.

Caversham has four public houses – considerably fewer than in its formative years. These are the Carisbrook Hotel, close to the sports ground for which it is named, Mitchell's Tavern in the South Road retail area, the Waterloo Hotel at Forbury Corner, and the Fitzroy Hotel on Hillside Road near Bathgate Park.

== Sport ==
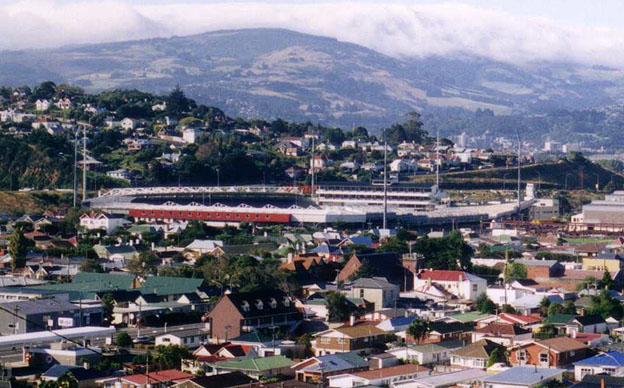
Looking north across Caversham to Carisbrook, from the slopes of Forbury Hill. Part of Hillside Road is visible lower left, and one end of the railway workshops is visible at the extreme centre right.

Carisbrook, the city's former main rugby union venue and a former Test cricket ground, was located at the eastern end of the suburb between The Glen and the Hillside Railway Workshops prior to its demolition. It was the home of Otago Rugby Union until a new stadium opened in North Dunedin (the Forsyth Barr Stadium at University Plaza) in August 2011. The new stadium is the new home of the Otago Rugby Union and Highlanders Super Rugby franchise, and met with some opposition within Dunedin, with objections focusing largely on the cost.

Other than Carisbrook, the suburb's main sports ground is Bathgate Park, which lies at the border of Caversham and South Dunedin in the southeast. There are several open areas of recreation ground and parkland, notably Kew Park at Forbury Corner and Sidey Park and adjacent parkland along the northern flank of the by-pass, and there are tennis courts close to Kew Park on Thorn Street, and a croquet club between South Road and the Caversham by-pass. Kew Park is also home to one of the area's most prominent pétanque clubs.

Other sporting links with the suburb include Caversham Football Club, one of Dunedin's most successful football teams. Caversham has reached the semi-finals of the national knockout competition (the Chatham Cup) on three occasions, and was a member of the former New Zealand National Soccer League for several seasons in the 1970s with a highest final position of fourth in 1975. They also played in the competition's final season (2003). Despite its name, Caversham play at Tonga Park, located in the adjacent suburb of Forbury, a ground they share with the Carisbrook-Dunedin Cricket Club. Caversham is also home to one of Dunedin's main athletics clubs.

The Southern Rugby Football Club, a rugby union club, is located at Bathgate Park to the southeast of Caversham. Southern is consistently among Dunedin's stronger club sides, and has been Otago club champion on over 20 occasions. It was formed from a merger of the Caversham and Pacific clubs in 1899. Southern's players have included over 20 All Blacks, including Stephen Bachop, Stu Forster, Jamie Joseph, Laurie Mains, and Gary Seear.

== Landmarks ==
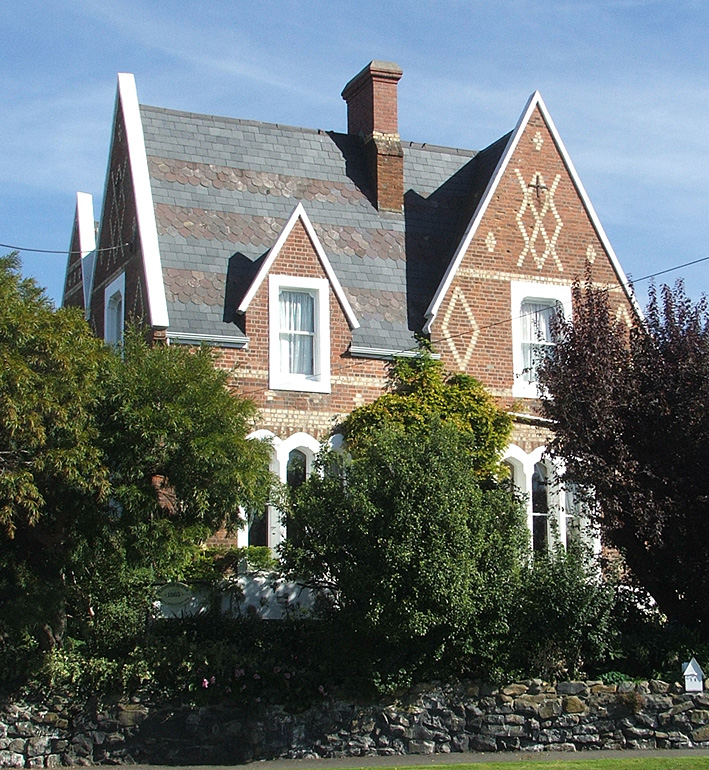
Lisburn House

Hillside Railway Workshops dominate the southeast of Caversham and the neighbouring suburb of South Dunedin. Established at this site in 1875, the workshops are the main railway construction and repair shop in the South Island. The workshops cover 8 hectares (20 acres), of which 3 hectares (7.4 acres) are covered floor space.

To the north of the workshops is Carisbrook, Dunedin's former main sports venue. Opened in 1883, the ground had a capacity of 35,000 people, and was floodlit from the 1990s. Used primarily for rugby union, but also for other sports (notably as a Test cricket venue), Carisbrook lost its pre-eminence among the city's sports arenas with the construction of a new stadium in the northern end of the city in 2011; demolition began in 2013. The ground is named for the former home of early colonial settler James Macandrew, which in turn was named after Carisbrooke Castle on the Isle of Wight in southern England.

Lisburn House is one of the finest surviving 1860s townhouses in New Zealand. Now run as a bed and breakfast establishment, this house was built in 1865 for the Fulton family, a pioneer farming family at their "Ravenscliffe" property on the Taieri Plains. The house was named after the family's origins in Lisburn, Northern Ireland, and is Category I heritage listed. William Clayton designed the 12-room house, notable for its steeply angled slate roof and polychromatic brickwork. Two other Category II heritage buildings are on Fitzroy Street: Faringdon Villa, and an untitled house.

Other buildings of note in Caversham include the suburb's churches. The Presbyterian church is located on Thorn Street, roughly halfway between the South Road retail area and Forbury Corner. It was built in 1883 following the destruction of the previous building by fire. The current building, built in Port Chalmers bluestone with Oamaru stone facings, was designed by T. B. Cameron.

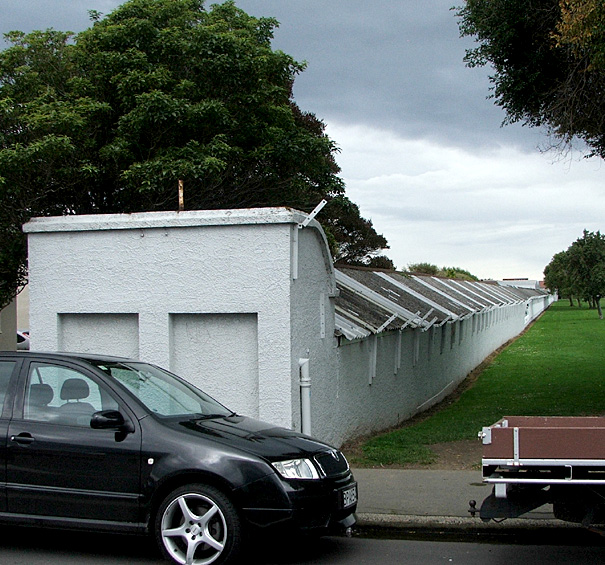
The ropewalk of Donaghy's Industries is one of Caversham's more unusual structures – it is over 100 times as long as it is wide.

Caversham's Anglican church, St Peter's, is located on Hillside Road. Designed by H. F. Hardy, the foundation stone was laid in 1882. The original design called for the church to have a spire, but because of problems with the tower's foundations (which left the tower leaning 6 inches (15 cm) from the perpendicular) this was never constructed.

Caversham Baptist church is located at the corner of South Road and Surrey Street, close to Caversham School. Unusual among Dunedin buildings, this church has a formal Classical style, with its brickwork augmented by pediments and square columns. The foundation stone for the building was laid in 1906. The former Baptist Church, in Playfair Street, is now used as a Gospel Hall.

A further church, located in South Dunedin close to the southeastern edge of Caversham, was the South Dunedin Wesley Methodist Church in Hillside Road. This building, constructed in 1893, was threatened with demolition from 2009, and finally demolished in 2017.

Part of the factory of Donaghy's Industries, adjacent to the eastern edge of Bathgate Park, is notable because of its unusual shape. This structure, which is less than 4 metres (13 ft) wide yet some 380 metres (1,250 ft) in length, serves as a ropewalk for Donaghy's, who have been manufacturing rope and twine at this site since 1876.

A somewhat controversial recent addition to Caversham was the opening, in October 2013, of Whakamana Cannabis Museum, New Zealand's first museum dedicated to the history of cannabis use. Cannabis, while still a criminalised drug in New Zealand, has moved some way towards grudging acceptance, at least as a subject for open discussion. The museum, run from a former residential house in David Street, is designed to be an information centre on aspects of the history and legislation surrounding the drug, and also a national centre for the Aotearoa Legalise Cannabis Party, a minor single-issue political party.

== Notable people ==
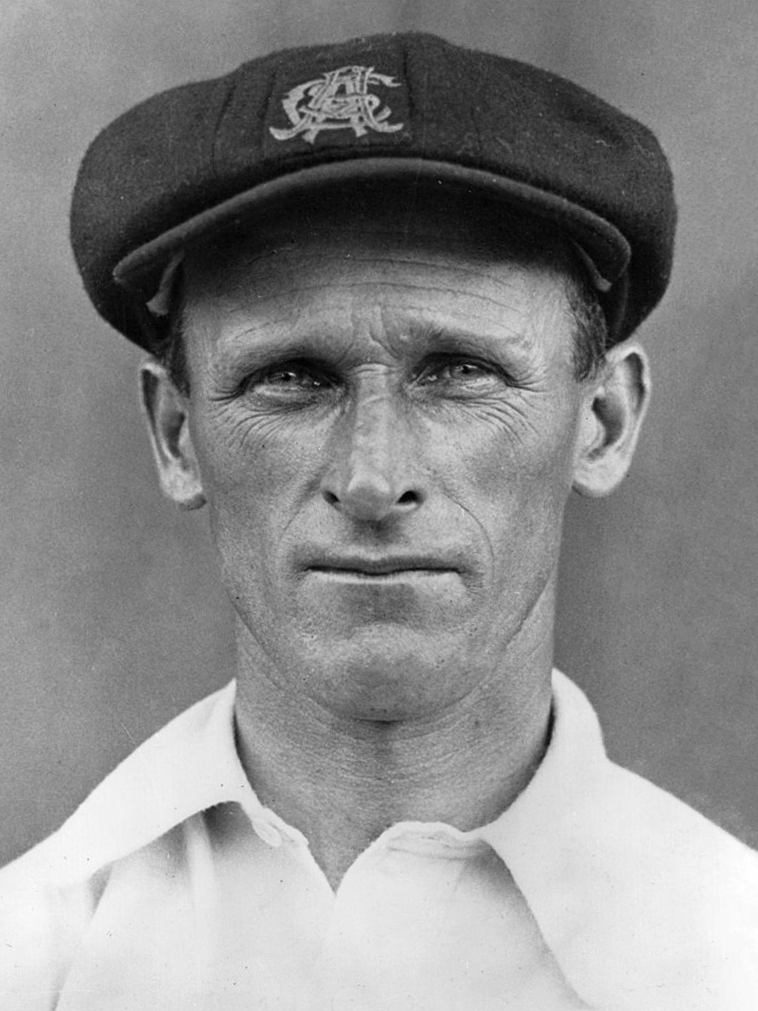
Test cricketer Clarrie Grimmett was born in Caversham on Christmas Day, 1891.

Noted residents in the Caversham area have included members of the Sidey family, several of whom were local or national politicians. Among these was Thomas Sidey, New Zealand Attorney General 1928–31. Sidey Park, close to the northern edge of the Caversham bypass, and Sidey Street in Corstorphine are both named in his honour.

Captain William Cargill, founder of the Otago settlement, lived just to the northeast of Caversham above The Glen; his house "Hillside" gave its name to Hillside Road, which was at one time called Cargill Road. The area around the site of Cargill's long-demolished house between The Glen and Kensington is still referred to as Hillside. Cargill's Corner, the major road junction at the South Dunedin end of Hillside Road, is also named in his honour.

Architect Edmund Anscombe was a Caversham resident. Anscombe was responsible for numerous important buildings in early 20th century New Zealand, many of which survive to the present day. Among them are the Sarjeant Art Gallery in Wanganui and the Former Post and Telegraph Building in Wellington. Noted local buildings with work by Anscombe include extensions to the University of Otago Clocktower complex in Dunedin North, the main building of Otago Girls' High School in central Dunedin, and the Allied Press building in Lower Stuart Street, Dunedin.

Another notable local resident was surveyor and architect John Turnbull Thomson. Thomson was Chief Surveyor of the Otago Province from 1856 to 1873, and Surveyor-General of New Zealand from 1876 to 1879. During his time as provincial Chief Surveyor, Thomson explored and mapped large sections of the interior of the southern South Island. Many of the place names in this region reflect Thomson's Northumbrian origins, with prosaic names in the form of a Northumbrian dialectic name for an animal. As a result, the area is still occasionally referred to as "Thomson's Barnyard" or "The Farmyard Patch".

Among sportspeople with Caversham connections, Australian Test cricketer and 1931 Wisden Cricketer of the year Clarrie Grimmett is perhaps the best known. Grimmett, the first player to take 200 Test wickets, was born in the suburb on Christmas Day, 1891. Noted rugby union administrators "Old Vic" Cavanagh and "Young Vic" Cavanagh were also born in Caversham. Between them, the father and son were responsible for changes to the way the game of rugby union was played through their innovative coaching methods and tactics. The cricketer, poet, songwriter and teacher Robert J. Pope (1865–1949) was also born in Caversham.

== Transportation ==
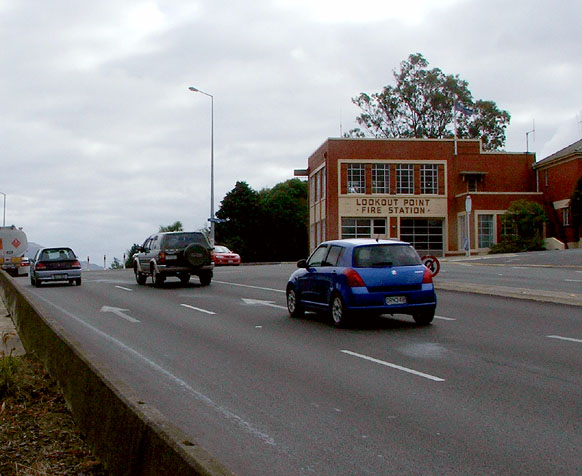
Cars sweep southwest over the Lookout Point saddle at the start of the Dunedin Southern Motorway. The brick building on the right is the local fire station.

The suburb's main road is South Road, which at its eastern (Glen) end winds around the flanks of hills before joining with Princes Street and Dunedin's central business district. A slip road connects South Road with State Highway 1 at the foot of these hills, just above Carisbrook.

Hillside Road, which runs parallel with South Road several hundred metres to the south, is an arterial route connecting South Dunedin (at its eastern end) with Dunedin's southwestern suburbs. At its western end is Forbury Corner, a road junction linking Hillside Road with suburban arterial routes to the suburbs of Saint Clair (Forbury Road) and Corstorphine (Easther Crescent), as well as David Street, the major road link between Hillside Road and South Road. Numerous other small residential streets run parallel with David Street between Hillside Road and South Road. The suburb's other main roads include Caversham Valley Road, Playfair Street, Surrey Street, and Glen Road. The latter of these lies at the Glen at the eastern end of Caversham, providing a link between South Road and the hill suburbs of Maryhill, Balaclava, and Mornington.

A Caversham bypass was constructed in the late 1970s and early 1980s, and was officially opened in 1987. It now carries State Highway 1 away from the retail heart of the suburb, connecting at its northern end with the city's one-way street system. With the construction of the bypass, Caversham Valley Road was truncated close to its junction with South Road, and the upper stretch of the road continued as part of State Highway 1, connecting the bypass with Dunedin Southern Motorway.

Until the construction of the bypass, South Road and Caversham Valley Road formed the main route out of Dunedin to the south. State Highway 1 followed South Road through the main retail area, then followed Caversham Valley Road to Lookout Point. Above its retail area, South Road winds around the flank of Calton Hill; Caversham Valley Road forms a straighter, steep route that originally continued from the end of South Road's retail area. For this reason, the part of South Road running through the retail area is also sometimes referred to as part of Caversham Valley Road. Improvements to Caversham Valley Road to ease congestion and increase safety began in 2011. A junction at the north end of Caversham's main retail area connects South Road with the bypass.

Caversham was served by a suburban railway station on the "South Line" between Dunedin and Mosgiel. Services ceased on this line in 1982. The railway station buildings were demolished several years later.

Trams served Caversham between 1880 and 1954, operating in Hillside Road, South Road, and David Street. Several bus routes now serve Caversham, connecting it with the heart of the city. Citibus and Dunedin Passenger Transport run routes from the city centre to Saint Clair and Corstorphine via Hillside Road, and to Lookout Point via South Road. Dunedin passenger transport also runs services between The Octagon and both Mosgiel and Brighton via South Road. Cargill's Corner, at the South Dunedin end of Hillside Road, is a major suburban bus hub.

== Works cited ==
- Bishop, D. G., and Turnbull, I. M. (compilers) (1996). Geology of the Dunedin Area. Lower Hutt, NZ: Institute of Geological & Nuclear Sciences. ISBN 0-478-09521-X.
- Brosnahan, Seán G., and Read, Peter J. (2002). The Birth of Modern Times: Dunedin's Southern Suburbs, 1890–1940. Dunedin: Otago Settlers' Museum. ISBN 0-908910-28-2.
- Chester, Rod; Palenski, Ron; and McMillan, Neville, (1998). The Encyclopedia of New Zealand Rugby. Auckland: Hodder Moa Beckett. ISBN 1-86958-630-1.
- Croot, Charles (1999). Dunedin Churches Past and Present. Dunedin: Otago Settlers Association. ISBN 0-473-03979-6.
- Dann, Christine, and Peat, Neville, (1989). Dunedin, North and South Otago. Wellington: GP Books. ISBN 0-477-01438-0.
- Galer, Lois (1981). Houses and Homes. Dunedin: Allied Press.
- Goodall, Maarire, and Griffiths, George J., (1980). Maori Dunedin. Dunedin: Otago Heritage Books. ISBN 0-908774-45-1.
- Knight, Hardwicke, and Wales, Niel, (1988). Buildings of Dunedin. Dunedin: John McIndoe. ISBN 0-86868-106-7.
- Hayward, Paul (1999). Even More Intriguing Dunedin Street Walks. Dunedin: Express Office Services.
- Hayward, Paul (1998). Intriguing Dunedin Street Walks. Dunedin: Express Office Services.
- Herd, Joyce, and Griffiths, George J., (1980). Discovering Dunedin. Dunedin: John McIndoe. ISBN 0-86868-030-3.
- Olssen, Erik (1995). Building the New World: Work, Politics and Society in Caversham, 1880s–1920s. Auckland: Auckland University Press. ISBN 1-86940-106-9.
- Reed, Alexander Wyclif (1975). Place Names of New Zealand. Wellington: A.H. & A.W. Reed. ISBN 0-589-00933-8.
- Rutherford, Alma (1978). The Edge of the Town. Dunedin: New Zealand Historic Places Trust (Otago Regional Committee). ISBN 0-908565-60-7.
- Sorrell, Paul (ed.) (1999). "Caversham" and "Lookout Point" in The Cyclopedia of Otago and Southland, volume 1. Dunedin: Dunedin City Council. ISBN 0-9597722-9-4.
