= Vic Cavanagh (sportsman) =

NZ rugby union administrator (1909–1980)

Victor George Cavanagh (19 June 1909 – 20 July 1980), known as "Young Vic" Cavanagh, was a New Zealand rugby union administrator. He was born at Caversham in Dunedin in 1909, the son of "Old Vic" Cavanagh. Between them, they had a major impact on the development of the sport of rugby union within New Zealand.

Cavanagh's playing career saw him play as hooker for the Southern club in Dunedin, and also a cricketer for Otago Boys' High School. Beyond the sports field he was a prominent newspaperman, having started as a compositor for the Otago Daily Times and risen to be General Manager of its major rival, the Evening Star from 1950. He oversaw the merger of the two papers and the formation of the new Allied Press company in 1974, becoming the first head of the new company until his retirement in 1976.

In sport, Cavanagh represented the Otago cricket team as a middle-order batsman, scoring nearly 1,300 runs in 27 first-class matches at a batting average of 24.44, and was named as a member of the national squad, although he never made an international appearance. In rugby, he played only seven games as wing forward for Otago in 1931 before injury ended his career. In 1934 he followed in his father's footsteps by becoming coach of Southern's senior team.

In 1929 Old Vic developed the 'loose scrum' technique to help lighter student forwards win ball in broken play. The new-look 3–4–1 scrum shape revolutionised forward play, and, with the refinements to what became known as "the Southern style" by Young Vic, led to the dominance of Otago in provincial rugby in the years prior to World War II. The two Cavanaghs were appointed co-coaches of Otago in 1936, and Otago held the country's major provincial trophy, the Ranfurly Shield for much of the following 14 years. In 1949, Otago provided eleven members of the national side to tour South Africa.
