= Vic Cavanagh (rugby union coach) =

New Zealand rugby union coach and administrator

Victor George Cavanagh (1874 - 11 June 1952), known as "Old Vic" Cavanagh, was a New Zealand rugby union administrator. He was born in Caversham, Dunedin. He was the father of "Young Vic" Cavanagh. Between them, they greatly affected the development of the sport of rugby within New Zealand.

Old Vic was the first captain of Dunedin's Southern Club after its formation through the amalgamation of the Caversham and Pacific clubs in 1899. He also represented Otago that year, but became better known as a coach. Cavanagh coached Southern to three Otago championships before World War I, then after the war he became coach of the University A team, coaching them to ten championship wins between 1923 and 1934. He was also a national selector in 1913.

In 1929 Old Vic developed the ‘loose scrum’ technique to help lighter student forwards win ball in broken play. The new-look 3-4-1 scrum shape revolutionised forward play, and - with the refinements to what became known as "the Southern style’ by Young Vic, led to the dominance of Otago in provincial rugby in the years prior to World War II.
