= Sara Cohen School =

Coordinates: 45°53′55″S 170°28′03″E

Te Whirika Sara Cohen School

Location
- 38 Riselaw Rd, Calton Hill, Dunedin

Information
- Type: State special school
- Established: 1926
- Ministry of Education Institution no.: 3816
- Enrolment: 78 (July 2026)
- Socio-economic decile: 6
- Website: Official website

Te Whirika Sara Cohen School in Riselaw Road, Calton Hill, Dunedin is a special needs school in New Zealand.

The Sara Cohen School was established in 1926. This school caters for special needs pupils from primary school age through adulthood, or ages 5 to 21. The school was named for the late wife of Mark Cohen, city councillor, campaigner for women's rights, and editor of the Evening Star newspaper from 1893 to 1920. In 1889, Mark Cohen was a major figure behind the founding of New Zealand's first kindergarten.

The school was based in Rutherford Street, Caversham until 2025, when it moved to its new site.
