= D. A. Hamer =

New Zealand historian (1938–1999)

David Allan Hamer (26 January 1938 – 15 May 1999) was a New Zealand historian.

Hamer was born in Remuera, Auckland and educated at the University of Auckland, where he was awarded a BA and MA in history with first class honours. In 1965, he was awarded a DPhil from Oxford University. He then went on to teach at Lancaster University, the University of Auckland and Victoria University of Wellington. He was chairman of the history department at Victoria from 1984 until 1986 and again in 1997. He also served as dean of arts from 1988 until 1991 and assistant vice chancellor for academic affairs from 1991 until 1994.

He was elected to a Fellowship of the Royal Historical Society. From 1993 until 1997 he was on the board of directors of the Urban History Association.

He died of a heart attack in 1999, age 61.

== Works ==
- John Morley: Liberal Intellectual in Politics. Oxford: Clarendon Press. 1968. ISBN 0198213980 – via Internet Archive., ISBN 1911204696
- ‘The Irish Question and Liberal Politics, 1886–1894’, The Historical Journal, Vol. 12, No. 3 (1969), pp. 511–532.
- Liberal Politics in the Age of Gladstone and Rosebery: A Study in Leadership and Policy. Oxford: Clarendon Press. 1972. ISBN 0198223501 – via Internet Archive., ISBN 1911204718
- Politics of Electoral Pressure: A Study in the History of Victorian Reform Agitation (Hassocks: Harvester Press, 1977). ISBN 0391006827
- ‘Gladstone: The Making of a Political Myth’, Victorian Studies, Vol. 22, No. 1 (Autumn, 1978), pp. 29–50.
- ‘Time, Space, and the Western Town’, AJAS, Vol. 1, No. 2 (July 1981), pp. 15–24.
- (with Max Kelly), ‘Urban history in Australasia’, Urban History Yearbook, Vol. [11] (1984), pp. 61–80.
- The New Zealand Liberals: The Years of Power, 1891–1912 (Auckland: Auckland University Press, 1988). ISBN 1869400143
- History in Urban Places: The Historic Districts of the United States (Ohio State University Press, 1998). ISBN 0814207898
