= Melanie Nolan =

New Zealand-born Australian historian

Melanie Claire Nolan FASSA (born 1960) is a historian and university academic from New Zealand, specialising in labour and gender history. She is the director of the National Centre of Biography at the Australian National University, and general editor of the Australian Dictionary of Biography (ADB).

== Early life and education ==
Melanie Claire Nolan was born in 1960 in Reefton, on the West Coast of the South Island of New Zealand, to Paul Nolan and Alison Coad. She attended many schools as her parents moved around the country for work, including Villa Maria College, Christchurch (1967–1971), Mercy College, Timaru (1971) and St Patrick's College, Teschemakers, Oamaru, (1974–1975) and Mount Maunganui College, where she was dux.

In 1978 she won a scholarship to study at the University of Canterbury, which she attended from 1979 to 1985. She obtained a Master of Arts in 1985, with her masters thesis titled Jack McCullough : workers' representative on the Arbitration Court. She then won a further scholarship to study at the Australian National University, which she attended from 1986 to 1989 for her doctoral degree. Her thesis was a case study of women blue-collar workers in Victoria, Australia, from 1880 to 1939.

== Career ==
Nolan lectured in history at Victoria University of Wellington from 1992 to 2008, including holding the position of head of the history department for two years. She also worked in the New Zealand public service, including the State Services Commission (1984–1986), the Treaty Issues Unit of the Crown Law Office (1989), and the Historical Branch of the Department of Internal Affairs (1990–1992).

In 2008 Nolan was appointed general editor of the ADB as well as Professor of History, Director of the National Centre of Biography (NCB), positions she still holds as of August 2024.

== Recognition ==
Nolan won the 2006 Archives & Records Association of New Zealand Ian Wards Prize, and was shortlisted for the 2007 Ernest Scott Prize for her work Kin.

In 2016 she was elected Fellow of the Academy of the Social Sciences in Australia.

== Selected works ==
- Suffrage and Beyond: International Feminist Perspectives (1994), (ed.)
- Breadwinning. New Zealand Women and the State (2000)
- Kin: A Collective Biography of a New Zealand Working-class Family (2005), Canterbury University Press
- Revolution: The 1913 Great Strike in New Zealand (2006), (ed.), Canterbury University Press
- War and Class. The Diary of Jack McCullough (2009), (ed.)
- Unions In Common Cause: The New Zealand Federation of Labour, 1937–1988 (2011), (ed.)
