= Richard S. Hill =

New Zealand historian (born 1949)

Richard Stephen Hill (born 1949), Emeritus Professor, is a New Zealand historian who worked as a public servant before becoming an academic. As a member of the Waitangi Tribunal he played a role in the reconciliation process between the Crown and Māori that led to the Crown's acceptance of indigenous concepts of history as a basis for political practice, enabling New Zealand to emerge in the late 20th century from its 19th century colonial origins.

In addition to his publications on that process and on New Zealand's history of intelligence and state surveillance, he is recognized internationally for a comprehensive series of publications on policing and social control in the colonial context, as his contributions to international publications attest.

Hill is an Honorary Life Member of the Labour History Project of New Zealand.

== Education and academic career ==
Hill received his BA, MA, and D.Litt from the University of Canterbury. He was awarded a Commonwealth Scholarship in 1972 and is a university fellow at Clare Hall, University of Cambridge (England). In 2009-10 Hill was an Academic Visitor to Wolfson College, Cambridge, and in 2012, he was a fellow of St Cross College, University of Oxford.

=== Stout Research Centre ===
Hill's teaching interests mirror his research interests: 19th century New Zealand history, the history of policing and social control as well as security and surveillance, Treaty of Waitangi (Māori: Te Tiriti o Waitangi) and Crown-Māori relations generally, and the history of the New Zealand labour movement.

When Hill joined the Stout Centre, he founded the Centre's Treaty of Waitangi Research Unit (TOWRU), which he managed from 2000 to 2020. TOWRU produces "reports for government, iwi and judicial and other agencies" involved in the ongoing reconciliation process.

Hill became the Professor of New Zealand Studies at the Stout Research Centre in 2006 and remained in that position until he retired in 2020; he is now Emeritus Professor and Honorary Adjunct Professor. He continues as a Postgraduate Supervisor and as general editor of the Stout Research Centre's online Treaty Research Series as well as the Security and Surveillance History series.

== Involvement in Treaty of Waitangi reconciliation process ==
=== Treaty of Waitangi ===
Hill has been acknowledged as "an established scholar of the Treaty of Waitangi," with "a sure grasp of the important interconnections between the centuries, especially where Maori engagement with the state is concerned." The Treaty was signed in 1840; the Treaty of Waitangi Act 1975 established the Waitangi Tribunal with responsibility for investigations of grievances leading to recommendations for resolution; in 1985, a change in the law expanded its coverage from its inception in 1975 backward to 1840 when the Treaty was signed. That expansion meant far more research covering a much greater period of time than originally envisioned, leading the government to establish the Treaty of Waitangi Policy Unit.

==== Treaty of Waitangi Policy Unit (TOWPU) ====
Hill worked as an archivist at the National Archives (now Archives New Zealand Te Rua Mahara o te Kāwanatanga) in Wellington before joining the Justice Department in 1989 to work as "one of the foundation members—and the inaugural Chief Historian/Chief Analyst—of the Treaty of Waitangi Policy Unit," initially established to provide advice. However, in addition to being the "sole historian" on the basis of whose historical research TOWPU's policy advice rested, Hill, along with other TOWPU colleagues, soon became "immersed" in Treaty negotiations.

In “Settling Historical Māori Claims under the Treaty of Waitangi: An Assessment of the First Twenty-Five years, 1989–2014,” Hill writes from his perspective as a participant. Because the then Labour Government wanted to expedite negotiations between the Crown and Māori over disputed assets, TOWPU moved from “investigating how to proceed with negotiations with tribes claiming breaches of the Treaty, and beginning experimental negotiations with a large tribal grouping,” at which point negotiations began "to dominate the work of the unit." As a Senior Negotiator at TOWPU, Hill was involved in the earliest negotiations, particularly those involving Waikato-Tainui in the North Island and Ngāi Tahu in the South Island.

The Manatū Taonga Ministry for Culture and Heritage's NZHistory website notes that the first agreement reached in these negotiations, involving Waikato-Tainui, was "a major landmark in New Zealand's developing treaty settlements process," and quotes Hill's Maori and the State (2009) to explain that the amount of money involved, which required the decision to supersede previous settlement agreements, indicated a major change in governmental policy occurring over "a mere six years." As Hill concludes, "Matters had, certainly in international terms, moved fast."

==== Waitangi Tribunal ====
As Hill himself notes, "Very few of those who enter directly into Treaty negotiations on the Crown side later move to the Waitangi Tribunal section." Yet in 2008, while a professor at Victoria University of Wellington's Stout Research Centre, Hill was appointed to the Waitangi Tribunal. He was reappointed in 2011.

Along with Ranginui Walker (Whakatōhea), Hill was part of the inquiry panel for the Wai 1040: Te Paparahi o te raki hearing, which presented its Stage 1 report to the Crown in 2014. This report dealing with Ngāpuhi claimants based in Northland "differs considerably from the tenor and content of most of the Tribunal’s historical claims reports" because it is "‘a contextual report, not a report into claims’ (at 1.4.1)," leading to its "findings on he Whakaputanga," a response by rangatira to a perceived threat to their authority. As Hill notes in "Settling Historical Māori Claims," the report's conclusion marks significant changes since 1975: As the current iteration of the Justice Department's website for the Waitangi Tribunal says, the Tribunal's “exclusive authority to determine the meaning and effect of the Treaty” as well as the power to “decide on issues raised by the differences between the Māori and English Texts of the Treaty” is now secure even when it goes against the government's political wishes.

== Publications ==
"One of the strengths of Richard Hill's work at large," per one reviewer, is his ability to draw "apt continuities" between 19th and 20th events in New Zealand. In addition to his specialist works, he has provided entries in the Ministry for Culture and Heritage's online encyclopedia Te Ara: The Encyclopedia of New Zealand summarizing such topics as the Treaty settlement process and the police in New Zealand.

=== The History of Policing in New Zealand ===
Between 1986 and 1995 Hill authored ~~"~~a five-volume ~~history~~ of ~~policing~~ in New Zealand, which is regarded as the most comprehensive work in its field." The initial volumes were published by the Department of Internal Affairs' Historical Branch as part of an "official Government-sponsored police history" marking "the Police centennial in 1986." With them, Hill "established himself as one of New Zealand's most rigorous historians."

In 2023 Hill co-wrote with Steven Loveridge a book about the Police Special Branch's surveillance of New Zealand citizens' personal as well as professional lives between 1900 and 1956 entitled Secret History: State Surveillance in New Zealand, 1900–1956. At the book launch, the Minister then responsible for security services, Hon. Andrew Little, described it as "an outstanding job of describing" the history of "early intelligence efforts" in New Zealand." Initially supported by a Marsden Grant, the project began, according to Hill, as an idea he had had fifty years earlier; it is the first of two volumes.

=== Contributions to research on policing internationally ===
Hill was a member of a group known as the Colonial and Post-colonial Policing Research Group (COPP) that was active between 2009 and 2011. Formed under the auspices of The Open University's International Centre for Comparative Criminological Research (since renamed the Harm and Evidence Research Collaborative), it was a "global network of academics, policy-makers and practitioners with a shared interest in British colonial and postcolonial policing and its legacy and the active promotion of research into international policing today." In 2011 the group's fourth workshop was held in Portugal, with the title "Reflections on Colonial and Postcolonial Policing in the (Former) Portuguese Empire." In 2018 Hill contributed "The Portuguese Colonial Policing Mission in Comparative Perspective" to an anthology entitled Colonial Policing and the Transnational Legacy: The Global Dynamics of Policing Across the Lusophone Community.
