= New Zealand Film Archive =

Former national film archive of New Zealand

The New Zealand Film Archive is an archive of New Zealand-related film. Established in 1981, the archive operated as an independent organisation until 1 August 2014, when it was amalgamated with Sound Archives Ngā Taonga Kōrero and the Television New Zealand Archive to form Ngā Taonga Sound & Vision.

== Content ==
By 2012 the New Zealand Film Archive collection contained over 150,000 items including moving-images from 1895 to the present day. The collection includes predominantly New Zealand features and short films, newsreels, documentaries, home movies, music videos, television programmes, commercials, experimental films and video art. The collection also contains items with significant Māori content, including records of karanga, whaikorero, iwi and hapu whakapapa, powhiri, wharenui and marae, kapa haka, Waitangi Day events (from 1934), raranga, tukutuku and whakairo. There are also stills, posters, scripts, clippings, printed programmes, publicity material, production records and files, personal records, storyboards, props and costumes, animation cells, taped interviews, glass advertising slides, ephemera and equipment.

== History ==
Dating to before the amalgamation of the TVNZ Archive collection, the New Zealand Film Archive maintained the National Television Collection on behalf of NZ on Air. This involved constantly recording off-air broadcasts including television news, dramas, documentaries, games shows, music videos, infomercials, youth programming and sport. Māori broadcasting was archived on behalf of Te Mangai Paho, the Māori Broadcasting Funding Agency.

The New Zealand Film Archive collection also holds the Chapman Collection. Deposited by Professor Robert and Noeline Chapman of the Political Studies Department at Auckland University, the collection begins with audio recordings of television news from the 1960s. From 1984 the collection contains VHS recordings of nightly news bulletins. The Chapman collection precedes TVNZ's own archival collection of television news.

=== 2009 lost film recovery ===
In early 2009, a collection of 75 American silent films previously thought to be lost, were discovered in the New Zealand Film Archive. The films date back from 1898 to 1929 and were previously thought to be lost films.

==== Background and restoration ====
During the time when they were performed the films were shipped to countries in a "distribution line" format, with New Zealand often being the last place the films would be shipped to. Because of the high cost of transport during this time and the flammability of the early film stock, most of the films were not shipped back to the United States, but were moved into government archives, destroyed, or given or sold to private owners.

The films were discovered during a visit to the archive by Brian Meacham, a Los Angeles film preservationist. Meacham was curious as to what films the archive held. As a result, it was discovered that the archive held a large number of early American films. The New Zealand Film Archive's Steve Russell said "It's one of the rare cases where the tyranny of distance has worked in our and the films' favour". In 2009, the archive agreed with the (American) National Film Preservation Foundation to repatriate 75 silent American films, all rare or previously thought by American archivists and scholars to be lost (the archive continues to hold many other silent-era American films). About 70 percent of the copies were complete.

In order to export the films back to the United States, the movies had to be transported in U.N.-approved steel barrels in incremental shipments. Many of the films had begun to deteriorate, with NFPF director Annette Melville saying "About a quarter of the films are in advanced nitrate decay and the rest have good image quality, though they are badly shrunken". The repatriated films from this discovery were sent for preservation and storage to five major film archives in the United States: the Library of Congress, the Academy Film Archive, the George Eastman House, the UCLA Film and Television Archive, and the Museum of Modern Art. Those films sent to the Academy Film Archive now form that institution's New Zealand Collection.

==== Films discovered ====
Of the 75 films discovered in the New Zealand archive, some of the more notable examples were John Ford's 1927 film Upstream and the 1923 film Maytime. It was also noted by The New York Times that many of the films that were recovered "underline the major contribution made by women to early cinema". Sony has assumed the costs for the restoration of Mary of the Movies.

The Hitchcock film The White Shadow was discovered in the collection, mislabeled as the movie Twin Sisters and lacked a title credit. The discovery of this film was named as one of Movies.com's "Biggest Surprises of 2011".

== See also ==
- Cinema of New Zealand
- List of New Zealand films
- National Film Library, New Zealand
