= Eventfinda =

Eventfinda Limited
- Type: Private
- Industry: Technology
- Predecessor: Eventfinder Ltd
- Founded: 2005
- Founder: Michael Turner; James McGlinn
- Headquarters: Auckland, New Zealand
- Area served: Worldwide
- Products: Eventfinda Platform
- Number of employees: 18
- Website: www.eventfinda.co.nz

Eventfinda is an online event discovery and ticketing service. Through an API, Eventfinda also syndicates event content to third parties for display in other media. The company operates in New Zealand, Australia, Singapore, Austria and the United States.

== History ==
Eventfinda was founded by Michael Turner in Auckland, New Zealand in July 2005. James McGlinn joined the company as co-founder & CTO in 2006. In 2010 Eventfinda formed a public-private partnership with New Zealand's Ministry for Culture and Heritage.

In July 2011 the company launched the platform in Australia under the brand Eventfinder. In 2011 Eventfinda Pro won Best User Experience at New Zealand's Internet industry awards, known as the Onya's.
