= Waihopo Lake =

Lake in New Zealand

- Location within Northland Region
- Location: Northland Region, North Island
- Coordinates: 34.756°S 173.043°E
- Basin countries: New Zealand

Waihopo Lake is a lake in the Northland Region of New Zealand.

The New Zealand Ministry for Culture and Heritage gives a translation of "a river [or water] one fears to cross" for Waihopo.

== See also ==
- List of lakes in New Zealand
