= Jock Phillips =

New Zealand historian, author and encyclopedist

Jock Phillips ONZM
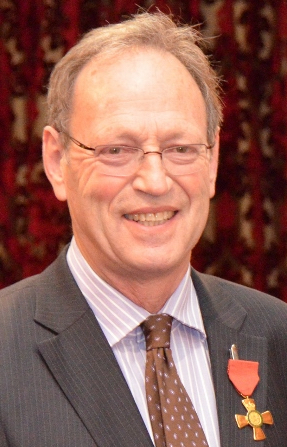
- Phillips in 2013
- Born: John Oliver Crompton Phillips; 1947 (age 78–79); Christchurch, New Zealand
- Education: Victoria University of Wellington
- Occupations: Historian; Author; Encyclopedist
- Known for: Chief historian; general editor of Te Ara: The Encyclopedia of New Zealand

John Oliver Crompton Phillips ONZM (born 1947) is a New Zealand historian, author and encyclopaedist. He was the general editor of Te Ara: The Encyclopedia of New Zealand, the official encyclopaedia of New Zealand.

== Career ==
Born and raised in Christchurch, Phillips graduated with a BA at Victoria University of Wellington, followed by a MA and PhD at Harvard in 1978. Returning to Wellington was a Lecturer, Senior Lecturer and Reader in History at Victoria. He was founding director of the Stout Research Centre (established by the will of the grandson of Robert Stout).

Moving to the Department of Internal Affairs in 1989, Phillips was Chief Historian (1989–1997 and 2000–2002) and general manager, Heritage (Acting) (1997–2000). He was Conceptual Leader (history) for Museum of New Zealand Te Papa Tongarewa 1994–1998, in the lead-up to its radical transformation, accompanying its move to new waterfront premises.

From 2002 to 2011, Phillips was general editor of Te Ara (New Zealand's online encyclopaedia), and then its managing editor of content from 2011 to 2014.

Phillips was mentioned in leaked diplomatic cables as an expert on New Zealanders' attitude to war:

Academic Jock Phillips added that Kiwis like to be seen as contributing to global military efforts, especially in peacekeeping roles, because, at times, this makes them feel morally superior.

and

Beginning in the late 1960s, many Kiwis became uncomfortable with being U.S. allies. According to NZ Historian Jock Phillips, while Americans took away military/political lessons from the Vietnam War, New Zealand came away with a new sense of national identity. Opposition to the war was couched in nationalistic terms, because like many Commonwealth countries at that time, New Zealanders were carving out a post-colonial role. Because of the Vietnam war and Britain's declining influence here, what arguably should have been a rebellion against the UK was instead directed against the United States.

== Honours, awards and posts ==
- Awarded the 2014 Prime Minister's Award for Literary Achievement in non-fiction, for his role as general editor of Te Ara: The Encyclopedia of New Zealand.
- Appointed an Officer of the New Zealand Order of Merit, for services to historical research and publishing, in the 2013 Queen's Birthday Honours
- 2011 recipient of the Royal Society of New Zealand's Pou Aronui Award for service to the humanities-aronui
- Member of the Council of the Victoria University of Wellington by election by the Court of Convocation
- Member of the New Zealand-US Education Foundation since 1995
- President of the National Library Society in 1994

== Published works ==
- Te Ara Blog contributions by Jock Phillips. November 2007–
- Phillips, Jock. Biography in New Zealand, Allen & Unwin. ISBN 978-0-86861-530-1. 1985.
- Jock Phillips and Ellen Ellis. Brief Encounter: American forces and the New Zealand people, 1942–1945. Historical Branch, Dept. of Internal Affairs. ISBN 0-908896-21-2, 1992.
- Phillips, Jock. The '51 Lockout: The Last Hurrah. David Grant, The Big Blue: Snapshots of the 1951 Waterfront Lockout. Canterbury University Press, Labour History Project. ISBN 1-877257-28-1. 2004.
- Phillips, Jock. Aberhart, Laurence. et al. The Caravan. McNamara Gallery. ISBN 978-0-9582430-0-1. 2002.
- Phillips, Jock. Dalley, Bronwym. Going Public: The Changing Face of New Zealand History. Auckland University Press. ISBN 1-86940-226-X, 2001.
- Phillips, Jock. Boyack, Nicholas. Malone E.P. Great Adventure: New Zealand Soldiers Describe the First World War. Allen & Unwin. ISBN 978-0-86861-579-0. 1988.
- Phillips, Jock. Maclean Chris. In the Light of the Past: Stained Glass Windows in New Zealand Houses. Oxford University Press. ISBN 0-19-558103-2, 1983.
- Phillips, Jock. Man's Country? The Image of the Pakeha Male, A History. Penguin ISBN 0-14-009334-6, 1987. ISBN 0-14-025658-X, 1996.
- Phillips, Jock. New Worlds? The Comparative History of New Zealand and the United States. NZ-US Education Foundation; Stout Research Centre, ISBN 0-473-00869-6 c1989.
- Phillips, Jock. New Zealand Memorial: 11 November 2006. Ministry for Culture & Heritage, 2006.
- Phillips, Jock Royal Summer: The Visit of Queen Elizabeth II and Prince Philip to New Zealand, 1953–54. Historical Branch, Dept. of Internal Affairs; Daphne Brasell Associates Press. ISBN 0-908896-38-7, 1993.
- Phillips, Jock. Hearn Terry. Settlers: New Zealand immigrants from England, Ireland & Scotland, 1800–1945. Auckland University Press. ISBN 978-1-86940-401-7. 2008.
- Phillips, Jock. Maclean Chris. Sorrow and the Pride: New Zealand War Memorials; editor Debbie Willis. : Historical Branch; GP Books. ISBN 0-477-01475-5 c1990.
- Unique Sort of Battle: New Zealanders Remember Crete / edited by Megan Hutching; with Ian McGibbon, Jock Phillips and David Filer; foreword by Helen Clark. HarperCollins New Zealand / History Group, Ministry for Culture and Heritage. ISBN 1-86950-394-5, 2001.
- Phillips, Jock. Te Whenua, Te Iwi: The Land and the People. Allen & Unwin/Port Nicholson Press / Stout Research Centre. ISBN 0-86861-762-8, 1987.
- Phillips, Jock. Making History: a New Zealand Story. Auckland University Press. ISBN 9-781-86940-899-2, 2019.
- Phillips, Jock. A History of New Zealand in 100 Objects. Penguin, 2022.
