= Te Ara: The Encyclopedia of New Zealand =

Online encyclopedia devoted to New Zealand

- Website type: Online encyclopedia
- Available in: English, Māori
- Headquarters: Wellington, New Zealand
- Owner: Ministry for Culture and Heritage
- Website: teara.govt.nz
- Commercial: No
- Launched: 2005
- Current status: First build completed 2014

Te Ara: The Encyclopedia of New Zealand (Te Ara meaning "the road/pathway" in Māori) is an online encyclopedia established in 2001 by the New Zealand Government's Ministry for Culture and Heritage. The web-based content was developed in stages over the next several years; the first sections were published in 2005, and the last in 2014, marking its completion. Te Ara contains over three million words in articles from over 450 authors. It has over 30,000 images and video clips, from thousands of contributors.

== History ==
New Zealand's first work that was recognisable as an encyclopedia was The Cyclopedia of New Zealand, a commercial venture compiled and published between 1897 and 1908 in which businesses or people usually paid to be covered. In 1966 the New Zealand Government published An Encyclopaedia of New Zealand, its first official encyclopedia, in three volumes. Although now superseded by Te Ara, its historical importance led to its inclusion as a separate digital resource within the Te Ara website.

Te Ara was developed between 2001 and 2014 and edited by historian Jock Phillips, who oversaw a full-time staff of about 20 writers, editors, image and resource researchers and designers during its creation. In 2010 during the development of the encyclopedia, the decision was made to integrate the Dictionary of New Zealand Biography into Te Ara. On completion of the work in 2014, Jock Phillips' contribution to the project was recognised with a Prime Minister's Award for Literary Achievement. The encyclopedia entered a maintenance phase and is now kept updated by a dedicated research team within the Ministry for Culture and Heritage.

In late July 2025, Phillips expressed concern that NZ$8 million worth of cuts to the Ministry for Culture and Heritage's budget made in the 2025 New Zealand budget could undermine the operational viability of Te Ara. These cutbacks included axing 26 roles, including four senior historians. By late July 2025, Te Ara was visited by 4 million separate users a year, accounting for 13 million page views per year.

== Structure ==
The encyclopedia is organised into several sections by broad themes, and entries on topics relating substantially to Māori culture are published in both Māori and English languages. The encyclopedia launched in 2005 with the first theme, focused on telling the stories of New Zealanders. It covers the migration of peoples to New Zealand, and the history of their settlement – both New Zealand's indigenous Māori and other groups. An overview section, "New Zealand in Brief", presents concise information and facts about the country. "Earth, Sea and Sky" published in 2006 covers ocean fish, sea and shorebirds and other marine life, the interactions of people and the sea, the country's natural resources, and shaping forces such as geology, volcanology, weather and climate. Distinctively New Zealand features are the main focus of the content, and scientific and technical data is presented within its social and human context. In 2007, "The Bush" was published, covering New Zealand's indigenous landscapes, forests, plants and animals, and the ways that people have used them or attempted to understand them. Topics also include early mapping, tramping, conifer–broadleaf forests, native fauna, taniwha, Māori exploration, threatened species, and logging native forests. Later themes were "The Settled Landscape" (2008), "Economy and the City" (2010), "Social Connections" (2010), "Government and Nation" (2012), "Daily Life, Sport and Recreation" (2013), and "Creative and Intellectual Life" (2014).

Colourful stripes (website element) used in the online edition of Te Ara. Each colour signifies a different section of content.

== See also ==
- List of online encyclopedias
