= Ngā Taonga Sound & Vision =

Film, television and sound archive in New Zealand

Coordinates: 41.27670°S 174.77856°E

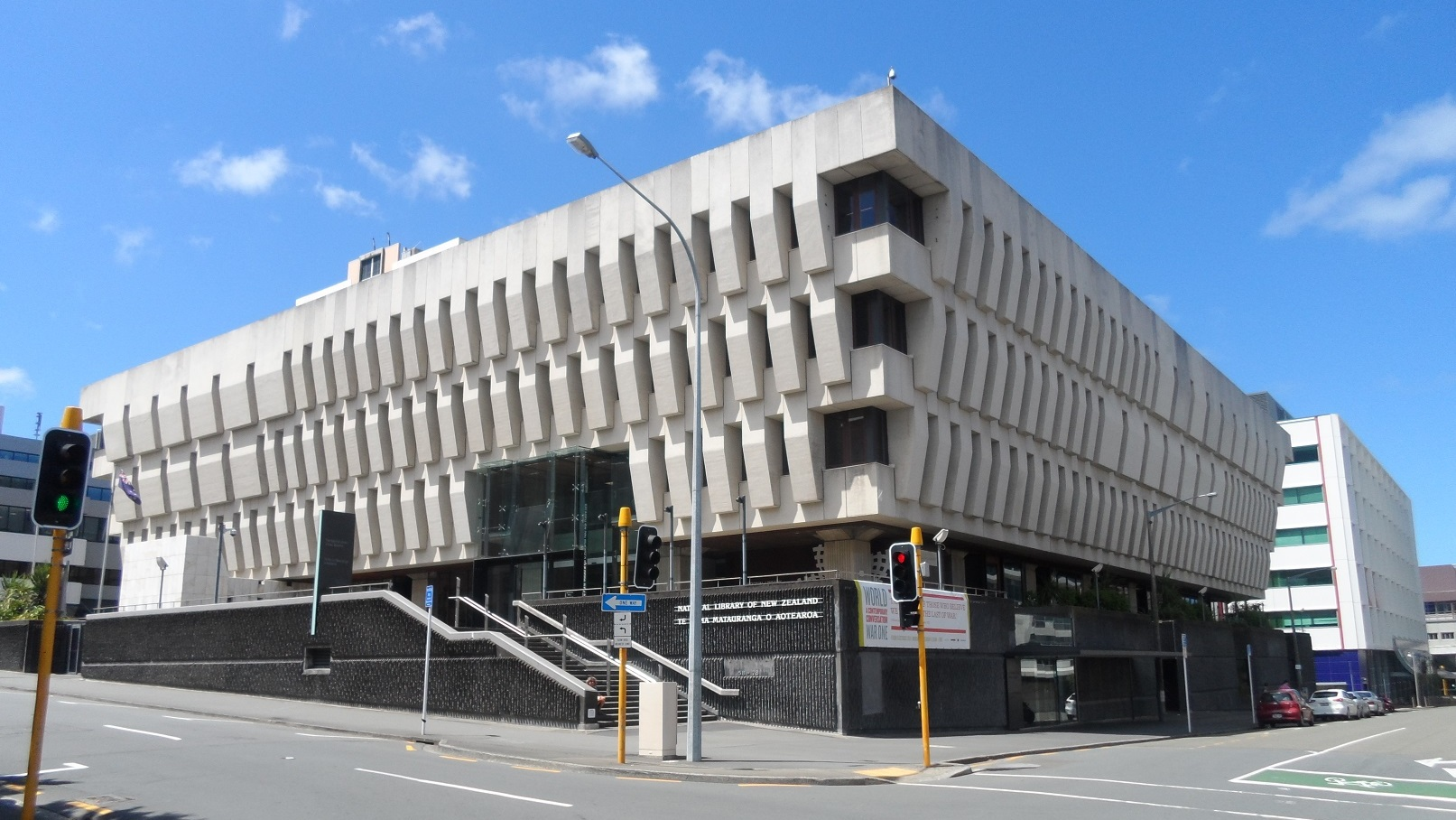
- The National Library of New Zealand Building in Wellington, home to Ngā Taonga Sound & Vision
- Former name: The New Zealand Film Archive
- Established: 1 August 2014
- Location: New Zealand
- Type: Film, television and sound archive
- Website: ngataonga.org.nz

Ngā Taonga Sound & Vision (the operating name for the New Zealand Archive of Film, Television and Sound Ngā Taonga Whitiāhua me Ngā Taonga Kōrero) is an integrated audiovisual archive formed from amalgamation of the collections and operations of the RNZ Sound Archives Ngā Taonga Kōrero and the Television New Zealand Archive with the New Zealand Film Archive. The integrated organisation was launched with its new name on 1 August 2014.

== Purpose ==
Ngā Taonga Sound & Vision identifies itself as New Zealand's audiovisual archive, with a purpose of collecting, sharing and caring for New Zealand's audiovisual taonga.

== Structure ==
Ngā Taonga Sound & Vision is an independent charitable trust (CC22250). It identifies itself as a Tier 2 public benefit entity (PBE). The predecessor organisation was The New Zealand Film Archive, incorporated under the Charitable Trusts Act 1957 on 9 March 1981. Between 2012 and 2014, an integrated audiovisual archive was formed from amalgamation of the collections and operations of the RNZ Sound Archives, Ngā Taonga Kōrero and the Television New Zealand Archive with the New Zealand Film Archive. The name of the organisation was changed to The New Zealand Archive of Film, Television and Sound Ngā Taonga Whitiāhua Me Ngā Taonga Kōrero, effective 1 July 2014. The Minister for Broadcasting Craig Foss announced Ngā Taonga Sound & Vision as the operating name of the new integrated archive organisation on 1 August 2014. Ngā Taonga Sound & Vision retained the Constitution and Kaupapa of the New Zealand Film Archive when it was founded in 2014.

== Funding ==
Ngā Taonga Sound & Vision receives core funding from the Ministry for Culture and Heritage from Vote Arts, Culture and Heritage. Over half of the $5 million annually received from the Ministry is for the management of the TVNZ Archive and RNZ Sound Archive collections. Te Māngai Pāho provides funding to Ngā Taonga Sound & Vision for the archiving of television programmes broadcast by the Māori Television Service and the archiving of iwi radio programmes, and the NZ Lottery Grants Board provides an annual fixed percentage of Lottery profits.

For the 2014/15 year, Ngā Taonga Sound & Vision received $1,590,000 from the Ministry for the ongoing "management, archiving and increased accessibility" of the TVNZ Archive collection. Thereafter it received $2 million per year for the same purpose.

On 19 October 2017, the Governor-General of New Zealand Dame Patsy Reddy launched Ngā Taonga Sound & Vision's patronage programme at Government House, Wellington. The archive established the patronage programme because of uncertainty over funding. At its launch, the programme raised $18,943. The public donation programme initially highlighted the need to preserve and digitise 200,000 Betacam video tapes from the 1980s which were predominantly from the TVNZ Archive collection. Chief Executive of Ngā Taonga Sound & Vision Rebecca Elvy told RNZ news that it would cost $10–15 million to digitise the Betacam tapes, which otherwise would be lost forever when the technology vanished by 2025.

== Collections ==
Ngā Taonga Sound & Vision manages three major collections: the New Zealand Film Archive collection, the Radio New Zealand Sound Archives, added in 2012, and the Television New Zealand Archive, added in 2014. In 2014, these three collections formed 65% of the total archives of Ngā Taonga. In addition, the archive holds five entries of the UNESCO Memory of the World Aotearoa New Zealand Ngā Mahara o te Ao register. As of 2025, the archive reports holding over 800,000 items, which includes over 600,000 hours of television and over 120,000 audio items.

=== New Zealand Film Archive collection ===
Established in 1981, the New Zealand Film Archive operated as an independent organisation until the creation of Ngā Taonga. By 2012 the New Zealand Film Archive collection contained over 150,000 items including moving-images from 1895 to the present day. The collection includes predominantly New Zealand features and short films, and contains items with significant Māori content, including records of karanga, whaikorero and iwi and hapu whakapapa.

=== RNZ Sound Archive collection ===
RNZ Sound Archive collection includes early audio cylinders, acetate discs, open reel tapes, cassette tapes and digital audio tapes. Radio New Zealand's Sound Archives were established in 1956 in Timaru, and originally dates back to the late 1930s when the State broadcaster established a "special library". In 1998, Sound Archives Ngā Taonga Kōrero was established as a subsidiary of Radio New Zealand, combining the archives of Sound Archives and Ngā Taonga Kōrero, a separate collection established in the 1960s by the New Zealand Broadcasting Corporation to preserve Māori language content. Leo Fowler and Wiremu Kerekere travelled throughout the country recording hui, marae openings, cultural festivals, welcomes and farewells. Both raw and edited audio was kept. For many years the collection was held in Papatoetoe, before moving in 1985 with the associated programme unit, then known as Te Reo o Aotearoa, to RNZ's Cook Street facility. In the 2000s the audio preservation staff moved with Radio New Zealand to a new Hobson Street site and the collection was moved to a purpose-built archive facility at RNZ's transmission site in Henderson. The RNZ Sound Archive collection became a part of Ngā Taonga Sound and Vision in 2012. Ngā Taonga Sound & Vision moved the collection to Avalon as part of the 2016/17 restructure.

The RNZ Sound Archive staff and collection were transferred to Ngā Taonga Sound & Vision on 1 October 2012. In 2014 the collection was valued at $800,000. On 30 June 2016, Radio New Zealand transferred the full legal ownership and title of physical assets used by RNZ Sound Archives to Ngā Taonga Sound & Vision at the time of the archive's transfer in 2012. The net book value of radio assets held by Ngā Taonga Sound & Vision was $423,946 on 1 July 2014, dropping to $172,029 on 30 June 2017.

In 2012, the Ministry for Culture and Heritage provided $1 million of funding for the digitisation of the sound collection. Internally the archive, was concerned that the funds were going to be used as a contingency fund for staff redundancy payments. The organisation received an additional $984,000 between 2013 and 2015 for the project.

=== TVNZ Archive collection ===
The TVNZ Archive collection holds over 600,000 hours of television spanning almost 55 years of New Zealand's public television history. In 2014 the Ministry for Culture and Heritage appointed Ngā Taonga Sound & Vision as the initial Archive Manager to manage the collection on a day-to-day basis. Since then, the archive has failed to comply with preservation and access targets set out in the Memorandum of Understanding (2014–2018) with the Crown. This has attracted national media and public criticism. In 2018, the archive announced it was starting work on a project to make the collection accessible online.

=== Memories of the World ===
Several archives held at Ngā Taonga Sound & Vision have been added to the UNESCO Memory of the World Aotearoa New Zealand Ngā Mahara o te Ao register. These include the theatrical cut and additional materials related to the 1983 documentary film Patu!, which documents the 1981 Springbok tour of New Zealand, oral history recordings collected by the New Zealand Broadcasting Service's Mobile Unit from conflict zones during World War II and oral history recordings in New Zealand between 1946 and 1948, the arts documentary programme Kaleidoscope spanning the years 1976 to 1989, and the documentary series Tangata Whenua: The People of the Land, originally broadcast in 1974.

Patu! was added to the register in 2012, followed by the Mobile Unit—New Zealand Oral History, 1946-48 recordings in 2014, Kaleidoscope in 2017, World War II Mobile Broadcasting Unit recordings in 2019 and Tangata Whenua: The People of the Land in 2024.

== Access to the collections ==
=== Onsite access and material requests ===
Much of the archive's content can be viewed in-person at the National Library building in Wellington. The former Taranaki Street building operated a 107-seat cinema, and until 2015, operated a gallery space.

Requests can be made to the archive to view content onsite or digitally, for content not currently available online. Material is often available after fifteen days, however some requests can take up to eight weeks in length.

In its Strategic Plan 2016-2024 published in mid-2016, Ngā Taonga Sound & Vision noted that the archive had a predominantly white, middle-class, Wellington clientele. The archive had targeted "art-lovers" and film aficionados "at the expense of every other group".

=== Online access ===
In 2013, Ngā Taonga Sound & Vision launched Mediasphere, a film-centric education service.

Since January 2016, Ngā Taonga Sound & Vision has operated an online video catalogue. The archive's Statement of Intent 2015-2018 aimed for 20,000 items online. However the Strategic Plan 2016-2024 published in mid-2016 noted that there was still only a small amount of the collection available online.

In December 2017, 1,914 of a total estimated 800,000 items were available online. By August 2025, this had increased to 14,336 items out of a total of 804,911 catalogue records.

=== Outreach ===
Radio broadcasts of collection material have produced the biggest audiences for Ngā Taonga Sound & Vision, with 924,000 listens in a year to a regular archival audio segment during Jessie Mulligan's afternoon radio programme on RNZ National.

Ngā Taonga Sound & Vision previously operated Medianet kiosks across New Zealand, which allowed viewers to browse content from the archives, which in 2012 included 915 moving image titles. The number of medianet sites dropped from seventeen in 2016 to thirteen in 2018.

== Acquisition and deposit ==
For much of the organisation's history, Ngā Taonga Sound & Vision has focused on collecting film, television and radio, as well as ephemera and documentation relating to works. From February 2017, the organisation begun to broaden the scope of what the archive collected to include musical works, digital works, oral histories, software, live broadcasts, recordings of meetings and recordings of nature such as bird-life. The organisation considers the rights of three stake-holders when accepting material: the depositor, the work's copyright holder and the cultural values of iwi and Māori.

Ngā Taonga Sound & Vision measures itself against the internationally agreed standards of the Image Permanence Institute (IPI) and the International Association of Sound and Audiovisual Archives (IASA). In 2012 the archive noted how it had attracted international interest for "its innovative approach to low-cost, high-quality collection storage using technology adapted from the horticulture sector". Ngā Taonga's 2016/17 Annual Report noted that only 56% of the collection was held in best practice storage conditions, and a 2017 report from the archive to the Ministry for Culture and Heritage noted that the entire film collection was stored in conditions that it considered was below standard. The former Sound Archive's acetate disc collection was also stored in below standard conditions.

Ngā Taonga Sound & Vision's Strategic Plan 2016-2024 noted significant issues with the archive's acquisition and deposit activities, including an out of date strategic plan, a significant backlog of material that had not been accessioned/catalogued, and depositors who had been promised a copy of their items but had not received them - with some waiting over ten-years.

== Accommodation ==
=== Current locations ===
The main offices of Ngā Taonga Sound & Vision are located at the National Library of New Zealand building on Molesworth Street in Wellington. Previously, the organisation had been based at 84 Taranaki Street, a building originally purchased by the New Zealand Film Archive for $2.5 million in 2002, and moved to the National Library building in 2019 due to earthquake concerns over the Taranaki Street building. Since 2017, Ngā Taonga Sound & Vision has stored most of its physical collection in the Avalon facility in Lower Hutt. The facility is owned by the Crown and managed by the Department of Internal Affairs.

In November 2017, Ngā Taonga Sound & Vision noted that since it was established in 2014 it had consolidated its property portfolio: from nine facilities in three regions, to five facilities in one region, with two small satellite offices in Auckland and Christchurch. Since this time, both the Auckland and Christchurch offices have been closed.

==== Avalon (Lower Hutt) ====
Since 2017 Ngā Taonga Sound & Vision has stored most of its physical collection in the Avalon facility in Lower Hutt. The facility is owned by the Crown and managed by the Department of Internal Affairs. It has four vaults: a cold vault, a documentation vault, a general vault and a temporary vault. The cold vault has a temperature of 7-8C which is higher than best practice conditions for the storage of film (2-4C), and the temporary vault which now holds the former Sound Archives acetate disc collection does not meet best practice conditions. Prior to the 2016/17 restructure at Ngā Taonga Sound & Vision, the TVNZ Archive collection was the only collection stored permanently at the former TVNZ Archive facility at 181A Taita Drive, Lower Hutt. Since the restructure, the majority of the archive's physical collection items have been moved there. The building contains 20 km worth of climate-controlled storage.

The facility and land are owned by the Crown and managed by the Department of Internal Affairs. In 2014 the Ministry for Culture and Heritage appointed Ngā Taonga Sound & Vision as the initial Archive Manager, giving it the right to occupy the publicly owned facility. The occupancy conditions are documented in the Licence to Occupy Archive Facility and in the Memorandum of Understanding - Access to TVNZ Archive Collection, between the Ministry for Culture and Heritage and the Department of Internal Affairs.

==== Map Room (Mount Cook) ====
Ngā Taonga Sound & Vision lease the Map Room in a two-storey underground bunker built into Mount Cook. The site is referred to in corporate documents as Buckle Street. Constructed during World War II, the bunker and tunnels are located underground behind the former Dominion Museum building, with an operational entrance next to Wellington High School on Taranaki Street. The storage area contains film, large equipment and paper documentation. In 2012/13 the store was reorganised and filled to 85% of capacity. The vault reaches temperatures over 18C, well above best practice conditions for the storage of film (2-4C) and paper based documentation (13-18C).

==== Plimmerton ====
Ngā Taonga Sound & Vision purchased 21 Northpoint Street, Plimmerton for $253,590 in September 2009. In 2011 the archive built a purpose-built storage facility to hold data tapes, film and video masters. The facility is referred to in corporate documents as Northpoint. The temperature of the vault is currently around 15C, well above best practice conditions for the storage of film (2-4C).

==== Titahi Bay ====
A purpose-built, 100 square metre climate controlled nitrate film vault was built in Titahi Bay in partnership with Archives New Zealand in 2013 on land owned by Radio New Zealand. The vault is referred to in corporate documents as Whitireia. Archives New Zealand contributed $100,000 towards the project which cost in total $366,000. After construction, Ngā Taonga moved four tonnes of flammable nitrate film from Makomako in North Wairarapa to the new vault over a one-week period. The vault also holds nitrate collections from Archives New Zealand and the Museum of New Zealand Te Papa Tongarewa. Even though it was purpose-built by the archive and publicised as having "controlled preservation conditions", Ngā Taonga Sound & Vision now believes the storage conditions in the vault are below standard and not within best practice. Currently the nitrate film is stored at 15C, where ideally it should be stored between 2-4C. In 2018 public concerns were raised over the vault's close proximity to a newly proposed radio transmission mast, potentially heightening the risk of inadvertent ignition of flammable atmospheres by radio frequency radiation - particularly when archive staff do regular "wind-throughs" of nitrate film reels.

=== Former locations ===
==== Wellington ====
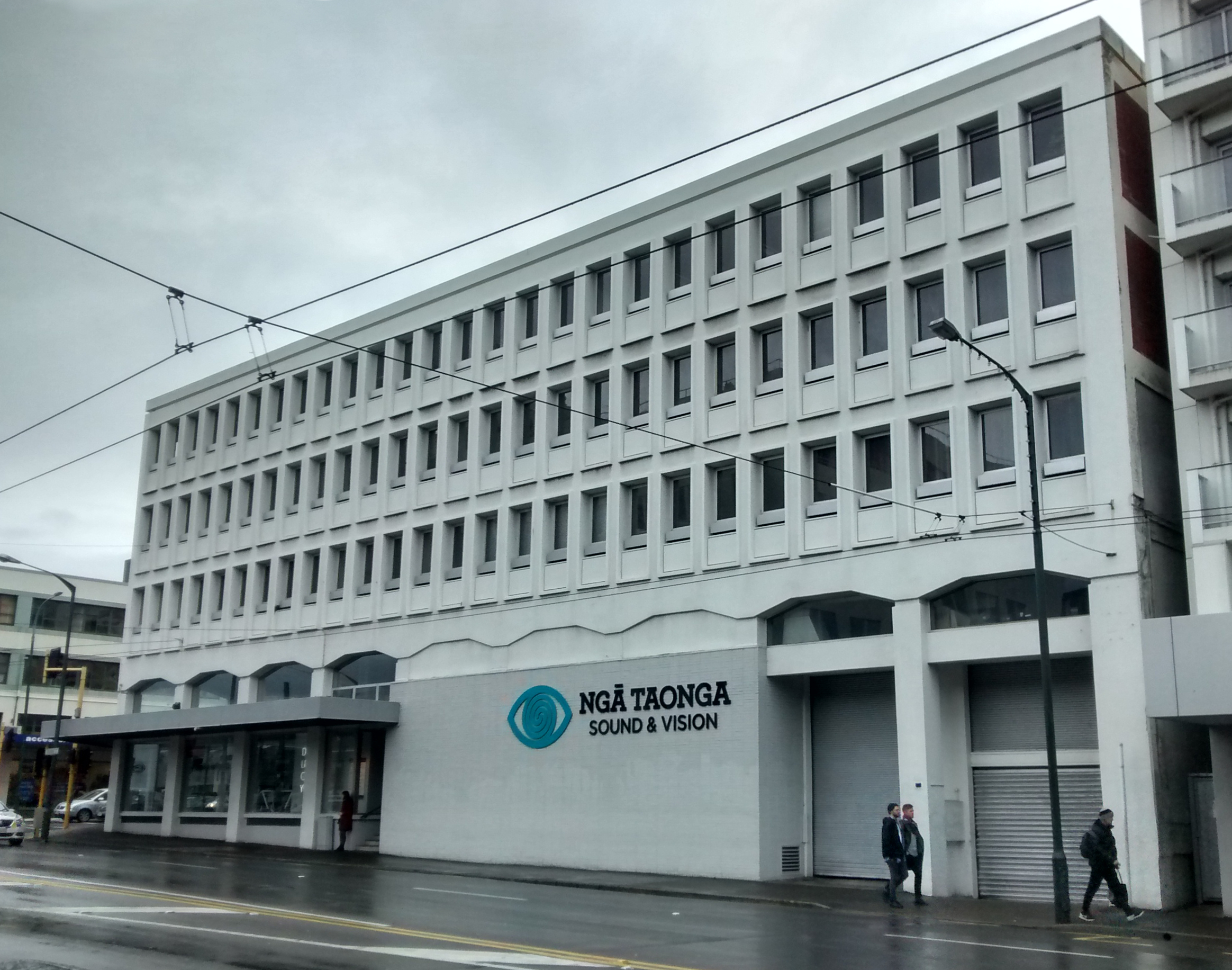
The former Ngā Taonga Sound & Vision building on Taranaki Street, Wellington, in 2015

2014 to 2019, 84 Taranaki Street in Wellington served as the head office of Ngā Taonga Sound & Vision, previously occupied by the New Zealand Film Archive. The New Zealand Film Archive purchased the property in 2002 for $2.5 million. It is a six-level building which housed a 107-seat cinema, the Jonathan Dennis research library, a media library, as well as offices and technical facilities, including a cold vault and a documentation vault.

In November 2017 Ngā Taonga signalled to the Minister for Culture and Heritage that it would need to exit the earthquake-prone site and further consolidate its property footprint. In early 2018 a newly incorporated company became the owner of the property. Under the terms of sale Ngā Taonga is leasing back the building.

==== Auckland ====
Ngā Taonga Sound & Vision had a satellite office located within Radio New Zealand House at 171 Hobson Street. From April 2005 it housed a branch of RNZ Sound Archives. The office was redeveloped circa 2014, with the construction of two studios, a separate tape cleaning area, on-site storage and a small office area. The sound studios were used to preserve the Ngā Taonga Kōrero audio collection. Ngā Taonga Sound & Vision moved the audio collection to Avalon as part of the 2016/17 restructure. In December 2015, staff from the former New Zealand Film Archive public facility in Karangahape Road moved to Hobson Street. Originally intended as a new public facility, the Hobson Street site was due to be refurbished and opened in early 2016. The site was to include a library and viewing spaces. However the branch remained closed to the public. Responding to news reports during the 2016 restructure, Ngā Taonga Sound & Vision said that there were no permanent collections in Auckland and that the facility only had two permanent staff who were in back-office roles. The Hobson Street branch was closed completely in December 2018.

In April 2005 RNZ Sound Archives moved the historic Ngā Taonga Kōrero audio collection to a purpose-built archive facility at RNZ's transmission site in Henderson, Auckland. The collection was relocated to Avalon as part of the 2016/17 restructure. The RNZ transmitter site at Titahi Bay also held parts of the RNZ Sound Archives collection. This site was still being utilised by Ngā Taonga Sound & Vision after the amalgamation.

Ngā Taonga Sound & Vision also had a branch site located at 300 Karangahape Road which was primarily moving-image focused. The facility, which was a former New Zealand Film Archive branch, was open to the public weekdays 11am-5pm, with free admission. It had viewing and research facilities, along with a frequently changing exhibition space. The Auckland branch also held regular public screenings in association with partner institutions, including Auckland University of Technology and Colab. Six staff were based there in 2014. Ngā Taonga Sound & Vision closed the facility in December 2015, moving staff to the Hobson Street site.

==== Christchurch ====
324 Cashel Street was the former location of the RNZ Sound Archive, and latterly the location of the majority of Ngā Taonga's sound archiving operations. It was the site of the archive's largest audio storage vault, in which over 90,000 items were housed in controlled archival conditions. These included early audio cylinders, acetate discs, open reel tapes, cassette tapes and digital audio tapes. The branch also held publicity materials and documentation relating to the sound collection. Preservation, cataloguing and client supply activities took place, and there were also public listening facilities (by appointment only).

After the closure of the Cashel Street location in 2017, Ngā Taonga Sound & Vision established a small satellite office located within the Blackheath Place office complex at 73 Durham Street South. The building is listed with Heritage New Zealand as an Historic Place Category 2. In early 2018 the office was relocated to shared business accommodation in the Hazeldean Business Park in Addington, which was closed in 2019/2020.

Two attempts have been made at creating a facility shared by two different organisations in Christchurch. Following the 2011 Christchurch earthquake RNZ Christchurch and RNZ Sound Archives shared the same building at 324 Cashel Street. The 2012 transfer agreement between RNZ and the then New Zealand Film Archive, pointed in principle to both parties again cohabiting a new RNZ Christchurch facility that was being developed, which did not eventuate.

The second attempt was a shared archival facility at Wigram, to be shared by Ngā Taonga Sound & Vision and Archives New Zealand. An agreement was signed in 2015, and construction was scheduled to start in the second quarter of 2016, but by 30 September 2016 Ngā Taonga Sound & Vision had withdrawn completely from the co-location project, pointing to their inability to pay the rental charges. Archives New Zealand continued the development of the Wigram facility, which opened in 2018.

=== Future locations ===
In December 2020, the Department of Internal Affairs announced that Ngā Taonga Sound & Vision along with Archives New Zealand and the National Library of New Zealand would relocate to a new purpose-built business park called the Horowhenua Business Park in Levin at an unspecified date. However, the Levin relocation project was not fully funded in later Budget bids and eventually cancelled by April 2024.

In February 2022 Internal Affairs Minister Jan Tinetti, Archives NZ chief archivist Stephen Clarke and Māori iwi (tribe) Taranaki Whānui Te Āti Awa announced that the Government would build a new archives building on the site of the former Defence House on Wellington's Aitken Street. The new NZ$290 million building will also host archives repository and specialist facilities for Ngā Taonga Sound & Vision, Archives NZ, and the National Library.

== See also ==
- Cinema of New Zealand
- List of New Zealand films
- Television New Zealand Archive
