= National Film Library, New Zealand =

New Zealand film library

The National Film Library (NFL) was established in 1942 following the gifting of some documentary films by the British Council, Government Film Studios and Ministry of Information for use in New Zealand schools.

From its founding until 1963 the library had Walter Harris (1903-1990) as its head. Previously a geography teacher, and then lecturer at Christchurch Teachers' College, Harris was later succeeded at NFL by Ray Hayes.

By 1946 the Education department's annual report noted that there were over 2000 films in the library. In 1956 a British Council donation of almost 1000 gramophone records was also made. By 1972 NFL held around 9000 16 mm film titles, totalling 34 000 prints.

NFL also developed a strong supporting role for the Federation of Film Societies, with the Education Department paying for distribution of Society prints around New Zealand. Returned prints were also checked for any damage by NFL staff.

As early as 1956 Harris also organised a meeting with other government officials to discuss the setting up of a New Zealand film archive. A wooden shed was constructed to contain potentially inflammable film stock. Efforts were made to collect films for a film archive from the 1960s via public appeals for donations. In 1956 an Auckland branch of NFL was opened and later, in 1966, the Christchurch branch was opened to cover most of the South island.

In 1990 the NFL became part of the National Library of New Zealand, merging with the School Library Service The lending of 16 mm film ceased in June 1997.

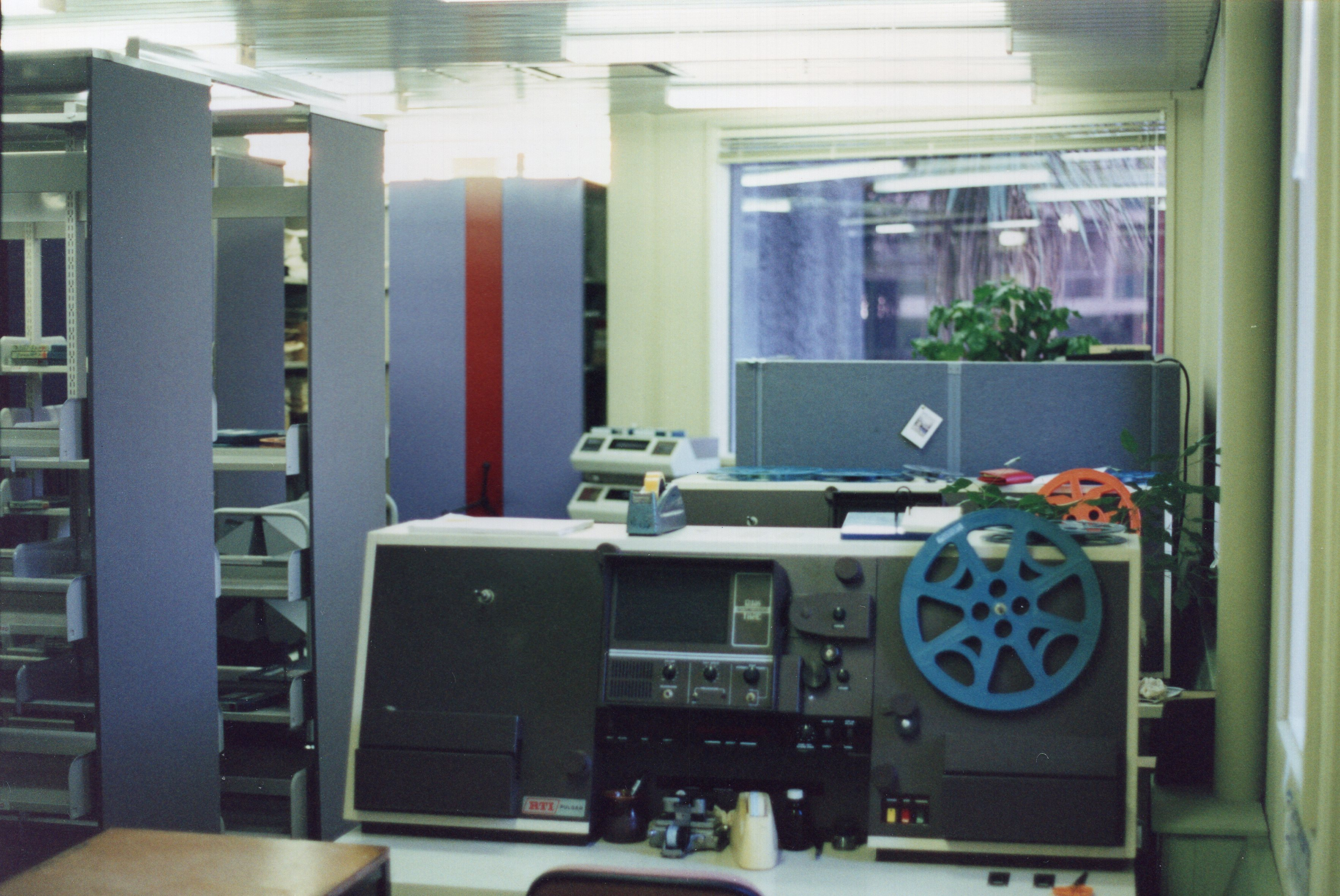
16 mm film checking equipment c1993
