= Television New Zealand Archive =

Coordinates: 41.1874°S 174.9452°E

The Television New Zealand Archive collection contains over 600,000 hours of television spanning almost 55 years of New Zealand's public television history. It includes New Zealand content such as documentaries, dramas, sports programmes and every TVNZ news broadcast from December 1986 to 2014. The archive only holds titles that have previously been broadcast – raw footage is not included. The archive also includes thousands of photographic stills. Both TVNZ and the Ministry for Culture and Heritage hold a list of the titles held in the TVNZ Archive collection. This has subsequently been released under the Official Information Act. The Ministry considers the majority of titles to be of high heritage and cultural value and the Minister of Broadcasting Craig Foss stated it was a "unique record of life in New Zealand". The contents of the collection are subject to the Public Records Act 2005. In 2014 the Ministry for Culture and Heritage, on behalf of the Crown, became the guardian of the archive. The physical collection is located in the Wellington region, in the former TVNZ Avalon facility now owned by the Department of Internal Affairs.

== Size of collection ==
In 2012 the Ministry for Culture and Heritage noted that TVNZ had identified items in the archive of commercial value – approximately 20,000 hours of news and 125,000 hours of other material. A further 375,000 hours of content had been identified as "heritage material". In 2013 the Ministry noted that the collection contained 647,000 items. This number was also used in the Cabinet paper that approved the transfer of the collection. However, in November 2017 Ngā Taonga Sound & Vision stated that it only contained 435,000 items, and a promotional video produced by the archive noted that there were approximately 373,000 physical items. In February 2018 the Ministry acknowledged that to their knowledge the collection had never been comprehensively audited before and was waiting on Ngā Taonga Sound & Vision to complete a stocktake of the collection. After undertaking the collection audit, the archive reported the following numbers in September 2018:

TVNZ Archive collection size
Media	Unit	Number of items
Film elements (picture and sound)	Reels	166,876
Videotape	Tapes	177,229
Optical Discs (DVDs)	Discs	19,611
Photographs (prints, negatives, transparencies)	Images	51,985
Documents	File boxes	1,927
Card Index	File cards	130,544
Total items		548,172

The number of photographs was estimated through an average count by box.

== Life-span of collection ==
In a briefing in early 2013 to the Minister of Broadcasting Craig Foss, the Ministry for Culture and Heritage noted that it would not be possible to preserve all of the titles in the TVNZ Archive due to the limited life-span of the current equipment, which was already obsolete. The Ministry noted that it may not be possible to purchase replacement equipment, and it therefore would be necessary to curate and prioritise the digitisation work.

In May 2017 Chair Jane Kominik noted to the Minister for Arts, Culture and Heritage Maggie Barry that within 4–8 years it was predicted that the Betacam and DigiBeta formats would cease to be accessible. In October 2017 the website of the Governor-General noted that 200,000 Betacam tapes from the 1980s, predominantly from the TVNZ Archive collection, are "deteriorating faster than Ngā Taonga can save them and it's estimated they only have eight years [2025] before the tapes degrade completely." Rebecca Elvy, Chief Executive of Ngā Taonga told RNZ news that the technology to digitise the Betacam tapes would vanish by 2025, and that the non-digitised content would be lost forever.

== Transfer to the Crown ==
In a 2014 briefing to Minister Foss, the Ministry for Culture and Heritage noted that the long-term preservation of the collection did not align with TVNZ's business needs, and that transferring the collection to the Crown would allow for the proper preservation of the collection. Both the Ministry and TVNZ explicitly wanted to ensure the archive was preserved and that it was made increasingly available for re-use through online streaming and other means.

On 24 May 2014, Minister Foss made a speech during the Budget debate in Parliament. He said "A very good announcement today was that over 500,000 hours of Television New Zealand archives will be transferred from Television New Zealand to the Ministry for Culture and Heritage and the Department of Internal Affairs to be made accessible to New Zealanders online. That is National's ongoing commitment to public sector broadcasting - the preservation of what we have already and making accessible stuff that has already been paid for and is owned by the taxpayer." Minister of Internal Affairs Peter Dunne said that the new archive facility would allow New Zealanders to access greater levels of audio-visual content online. "This is great news for teachers, researchers and anyone interested in New Zealand's television heritage" he said.

On 1 August 2014 guardianship of the TVNZ Archive was transferred from the state broadcaster TVNZ to the Crown. Minister Foss said the transfer reflected the Government's commitment to better public services and value for money by investing in the "purchase, improvement and ongoing operation of the archive."

Budget 2014 included $24.4 million to facilitate the transfer and ongoing management of the archive. Of that, $11.32 million was for the purchase of the TVNZ Archive facility at Avalon – including land, building, fixtures, fittings and plant. $5.066 million was for the depreciation and capital charge of the facility, and $8 million (spread over four years) was for the ongoing management of the archive.

The building and land were transferred to the Department of Internal Affairs and the Ministry for Culture and Heritage took over guardianship of the collection.

== Ngā Taonga Sound & Vision becomes Archive Manager ==
In July 2012 a document from the Ministry for Culture and Heritage noted that it remained "MCH's objective that Avalon [the TVNZ Archive] will in due course be much more closely aligned with the activities of the New Zealand Film Archive [now Ngā Taonga]". And so in 2014 the Ministry for Culture and Heritage appointed Ngā Taonga Sound & Vision as the initial Archive Manager to manage the TVNZ Archive collection on a day-to-day basis. A Memorandum of Understanding between the Minister for Arts Culture and Heritage Chris Finlayson and the Chair of Ngā Taonga Sound & Vision Jane Kominik was signed on 1 August 2014. The Memorandum of Understanding was due to expire on 30 June 2017 but was extended by mutual agreement, and without modification, until 30 June 2018.

Following an Official Information Act request for more information about how Ngā Taonga was awarded the management of the TVNZ Archive collection, the Ministry revealed that it held very little official information authored by Ngā Taonga relating to the archive between 2012-2014. It only held two general organisation-wide reports, a draft digitisation summary, a draft operating budget and a table of criteria for the TVNZ Archive that Ngā Taonga had contributed to.

=== Compliance ===
The Minister of Arts, Culture and Heritage Chris Finlayson appointed the Ministry for Culture and Heritage to monitor Ngā Taonga Sound & Vision, and to advise the Minister on the archive's ongoing service and financial performance. The Board of Ngā Taonga were responsible for ensuring the archive complied with the terms of the Memorandum of Understanding. The Memorandum allowed for the Minister to amend the agreement, withhold payments from Ngā Taonga or require repayment if the agreed outputs were not being met. These options however were never utilised by either Maggie Barry or Grant Robertson - the two Ministers responsible for overseeing the archive's activities during the period when the archive didn't meet its targets. Ms Barry did however request a progress report on the TVNZ digitistion project in 2017. This was supplied to the Ministry in September 2018, but has not been supplied to the current Minister, Grant Robertson.

=== Funding ===
In 2012 the Ministry for Culture and Heritage estimated the annual net cost to TVNZ of running the TVNZ Archive was between $0.5 and $1 million. For the 2014/15 year Ngā Taonga Sound & Vision received $1,590,000 from the Ministry for Culture and Heritage for the ongoing "management, archiving and increased accessibility" of the TVNZ Archive collection. Thereafter it received $2 million per year for the same purpose. Two documents were used to inform the initial Budget Bid for operating expenses by the Ministry for Culture and Heritage: a financial due diligence report from PriceWaterhouseCoopers and a "proposal from the New Zealand Film Archive". The Ministry later clarified that the Film Archive proposal was actually just a series of three draft budgets.

In May 2017 Chair of Ngā Taonga Sound & Vision Jane Kominik wrote to the Minister for Arts Culture and Heritage Maggie Barry noting that the archive was about to begin discussions with the Ministry for Culture and Heritage over two areas "for which Nga Taonga has never been funded": access to audiovisual collections beyond current levels and the digitisation of TVNZ Betacam and DigiBeta tape formats beyond business as usual levels.

In November 2017 Ngā Taonga Sound & Vision noted to the Minister for Arts, Culture and Heritage that activity-based costings were not conducted at the time of the TVNZ Archive transfer in 2014.

=== 20,000 titles project ===
On 31 July 2014 an event was held at Ngā Taonga Sound & Vision in Wellington to mark the transfer of the day-to-day management of the TVNZ Archive to Ngā Taonga Sound & Vision. The event also marked the public launch of the amalgamated archive's new name: New Zealand Archive of Film, Television and Sound Ngā Taonga Whitiahua me Ngā Taonga Kōrero. The event included three official speeches from Chair of Ngā Taonga Sound & Vision Jane Kominik, Board member Derek Fox and the Minister of Broadcasting Craig Foss. During Minister Foss's speech he announced a digitisation and access project.

Minister Foss said the TVNZ Archive transfer was not only about better public services and value for money, but it was also about public access to the collection. He gave Ngā Taonga the explicit responsibility of digitising the items of highest heritage value in the collection, ensuring New Zealanders could get online access, free of charge.

He said Ngā Taonga Sound & Vision would start immediately on that task, promising that the "first fruits of that work" would be online before the end of 2014. He was told that Ngā Taonga Sound & Vision hoped "to have around 20,000 titles or 5,000 hours of content online within the next three years". The figure of 20,000 was also used in a Government press release, reported in the media and talked about in an interview with Ngā Taonga Sound & Vision's first Chief Executive Frank Stark on Radio New Zealand's Mediawatch programme. In the interview Mr Stark affirmed that the archive's "main interest is providing public access".

The 20,000 figure differs significantly from the digitisation and access targets set out in the Memorandum of Understanding between the Minister for Arts, Culture and Heritage and Ngā Taonga Sound & Vision, signed the next day (1 August 2014) by Chair of Ngā Taonga Jane Kominik. In an email on 4 November 2014 to the Ministry for Culture and Heritage, Frank Stark described the 20,000 titles as an "ambitious challenge". He felt it unlikely that the archive would make a bid for new funding in Budget 2015, but said the archive would need to consider the implications of the target set by Minister Foss.

In November 2013, prior to the TVNZ Archive transfer, Ngā Taonga provided the Ministry with a draft digitisation summary. Two project work streams would digitise 25,250 hours of TVNZ Archive content over a three-year period. The archive estimated this would equate to 55,550 individual programme titles - the majority being approximately 30-minutes in duration or less. An additional 9,750 hours of content was identified as a baseline work stream. This would be achieved over a three-year period with staff moving away from a production library activity to an archiving activity. These digitisation targets were significantly higher than what the archive had previously been able to achieve. A digitisation proposal from the archive in 2013 said that its medialab digitised 5,000-10,000 film and video titles per year. The archive's Annual Report noted that only 5,793 titles were digitised in 2012/13 and 5,807 titles in 2013/14. In the 2014/15 Annual Report the digitisation key performance indicator was dropped and replaced with the more ambiguous Digital Titles Added (which included a combination of born-digital and digitisation activities).

In early November 2014 the Board of Ngā Taonga Sound & Vision agreed that the archive needed to verify the size of the TVNZ Archive collection and confirm the extent of the archive's obligations under the recently signed transfer agreements. On 21 November 2014 the archive held its annual Strategic Planning hui. The Board and all staff focused on two issues, one of them being "How does Ngā Taonga respond to the challenge of making 20,000 titles accessible online within 3 years". The results of the discussion were to feed directly into the Board's planning for the 5-year strategic plan and Statement of Intent 2014-2017.

On 12 November 2016 an Official Information Act request was submitted to the Ministry for Culture and Heritage requesting the status of the 20,000 titles project. The Ministry responded two months later saying that it had not received any reports from Ngā Taonga Sound & Vision specifically in relation to the digitisation of the TVNZ Archive since its establishment in August 2014.

The Ministry did however point to excerpts from two six-monthly reports provided by Ngā Taonga. The first report from late-2014 noted that a preservation programme for the TVNZ Archive collection aimed to be up and running in early 2015. The second report from mid-2016 noted that a digitisation trial had commenced in April 2016. It also pointed to Ngā Taonga Sound & Vision's Annual Report 2015/16 which noted that digital titles were added consistently throughout the year and the target was narrowly missed. The Annual Report went on to note that "a new focused digitisation programme at Avalon has helped accelerate work in this area".

In January 2017, an internal memorandum to Ministry for Culture and Heritage Chief Executive Paul James noted that Ngā Taonga Sound & Vision "has a long way to go" to achieve the target of 20,000 digitised titles. The memorandum went on to note that the draft Letter of Expectations provided to the Minister for Arts, Culture and Heritage Maggie Barry for signature established the expectation that Ngā Taonga Sound & Vision would continue to deliver this work within baseline funding. In March the Minister for Culture and Heritage Maggie Barry requested a report on the progress of the digitisation project. The report was due by 30 June 2018 but the archive failed to submit it to the new Associate Minister for Culture and Heritage Grant Robertson.

When questioned over the digitisation project in November 2017 by RNZ news, Ngā Taonga Sound & Vision's Rebecca Elvy said that when she became Chief Executive in 2015 and learned of the 20,000 target, she made it clear to the Ministry for Culture and Heritage that it was unrealistic. "They agreed with that view" she said. Ngā Taonga went on to say that "we can't find any evidence that Ngā Taonga knew of or were a party to that number [20,000 titles] before it was announced"

The Ministry later said that although they agree the conversation(s) with Chief Executive Rebecca Elvy took place they could not provide any dates or official record of the exchange(s). No Ministry for Culture and Heritage documents exist that reference the Ministry believing the digitisation and access target to be unrealistic.

When questioned about the 20,000 titles statement he made in 2014, former Minister Craig Foss told RNZ he could not recall the target and added it must have been set by the Ministry for Culture and Heritage. RNZ news asked the Ministry why Minister Foss's public target was 13,000 titles more than what was signed-up to in the Memorandum of Understanding. The Ministry replied "Minister Foss announced an ambitious target." When RNZ tried to ask further questions the Ministry phoned RNZ to say that their questions were "aggressive". The archive's own Statement of Intent 2015-2018 noted that it aimed to have 20,000 items (not only TVNZ titles) online by 2018.

== Public access and digitisation via Ngā Taonga ==
=== Online catalogue ===
In the 2014 transfer agreement between TVNZ, the Ministry for Culture and Heritage and Ngā Taonga Sound & Vision, the archive was given the right to publish an online database containing a précis of each TVNZ title - making the TVNZ Archive database searchable by the general public.

However discussions over public access to the database only began in November 2017, three years after Ngā Taonga became manager of the collection. TVNZ had earlier said that the database contained commercially sensitive fields that prevented the database going online. According to TVNZ this also prevented video files from appearing online as they needed to be attached to catalogue records. However it was later revealed by Ngā Toanga that the archive didn't actually have the technical infrastructure to support online access when it became manager of the collection in 2014.

In June 2018 after a "comprehensive audit of the collection" Ngā Taonga announced that metadata from over 400,000 items in the TVNZ Archive database would be searchable by the public in an online catalogue by August 2018. Catalogue records would include a reference number, series title, programme title, précis, year, duration, production company and credits. Shotlists would not be included as this had been deemed "commercially or legally sensitive".

=== 2014 - 2018 ===
Ngā Taonga Sound & Vision noted in its 2013/14 Annual Report that development work had commenced on a greatly expanded online delivery platform for the large quantities of material resulting from digitisation projects - and specifically from the "commitment to public access arising from the TVNZ transfer." However in an email from December 2017, released under the Official Information Act, General Manager of Information Services Sarah Davy acknowledged that at the time Ngā Taonga became Archive Manager in 2014 it did not have the technical infrastructure to support online access as described in the TVNZ transfer agreement.

In May 2014 a Ministry for Culture and Heritage briefing noted that the Crown would be reliant on the charitable trust to deliver its objectives in terms of digitising and increasing public accessibility to archive material. The briefing also noted that the archive had indicated that by June 2016 2,000 items would be available on the internet.

The Memorandum of Understanding signed between the Minister for Arts, Culture and Heritage and Ngā Taonga Sound & Vision on 1 August 2014 set out clear outcomes and outputs for Ngā Taonga. These included:

- A meeting every year with the Crown to agree a policy/schedule for the copying of the collection over the following 12 months.
- By 30 June 2018, a total of 10,000 items digitised.
- By 30 June 2018, a total of 9,500 items online.
- Subject to funding, a minimum of 2,000 items on the internet by 30 June 2016.
- An online version of elements from the TVNZ Archive database. This would include a precis of each title, and allow the public to search the collection.

However in November 2017, in response to an Official Information Act request, the Ministry for Culture and Heritage stated that no items had been placed online and only 2,139 items had been digitised.

TVNZ Archive items digitised by Ngā Taonga
	2014/15	2015/16	2016/17	2017/18	Totals
MoU targets	1,000	3,000	3,000	3,000	10,000
Actually digitised	0	504	1,360	275?	2,139?

TVNZ Archive items available online via Ngā Taonga
	2014/15	2015/16	2016/17	2017/18	Totals
MoU targets	500	2,000	3,000	4,000	9,500
Actually online	0	0	0	0	0

Rebecca Elvy, Chief Executive of Ngā Taonga Sound & Vision, told RNZ news in November 2017 that "It's fair to say that no one involved in the original agreement fully understood what it would take to make such a large and complex collection publicly assessable in digital form." Ms Elvy told RNZ news that it wasn't until 2017 that the archive had acquired all the equipment needed to undertake the work. She went on to say that the technology to transfer 200,000 Betacam tapes would vanish by 2025. Ms Elvy denied the digitisation project had been a failure so far. She added that the Ministry of Culture and Heritage had never raised any concerns.

In a statement to RNZ news, the Ministry for Culture and Heritage said it was confident the Trust was "taking the steps required to manage the TVNZ Archive and to make it available to the public. While the number of items available online [0] is lower than targeted [9,500], Ngā Taonga's essential purpose is to ensure the preservation of the irreplaceable collections it holds."

However it wasn't until after RNZ began reporting on the project that Ngā Taonga started working on getting the TVNZ Archive database online as well as beginning to make a priority list for preservation. According to a private email from Ms Elvy to TVNZ, this was at least in part to get "[name redacted] off our case by meeting the targets in one foul swoop!!" In response to an earlier Official Information Act request, TVNZ consulted with Ngā Taonga senior manager Sarah Davy and then confirmed that from the start of 2014 until November 2017 there had been no correspondence between the two organisations regarding making TVNZ Archive titles or the TVNZ Archive database freely available online. The Minister of Broadcasting, Communications and Digital Media Clare Curran confirmed in March 2018 that she was aware of the complete lack of correspondence between TVNZ and the archive on the issue. TVNZ subsequently confirmed that apart from a service agreement between itself and the archive, the broadcaster held no official information between 2013-2017 relating to the digitisation of the TVNZ Archive collection or public online access to the collection or database.

On 25 November 2017 RNZ news reported that Ngā Taonga Sound & Vision had "deliberately abandoned key television digitisation targets saying it doesn't have the money to meet them". Ngā Taonga Sound & Vision told RNZ news that it had dropped the targets entirely from its four-year plan, and that if there was demand for a specific title to be digitised then it would do it. Having no targets was contrary to the Memorandum of Understanding between the Minister for Arts, Culture and Heritage and the archive.

By the end of the agreement period on 30 June 2018, no TVNZ Archive items were available online, the TVNZ Archive database was not online and no meetings had occurred between the Crown and Ngā Taonga relating to setting a policy/schedule for the copying of the collection. Even though the Ministry for Culture and Heritage was obliged to monitor Ngā Taonga's service and financial performance it had stopped receiving or seeking information about the MoU targets six-months earlier, in November 2017.

In 2017, the Minister for Arts, Culture and Heritage Maggie Barry requested a progress report from Ngā Taonga on its management of the TVNZ Archive collection. The archive submitted its report in September 2018. Regarding the digitisation and access targets that it had agreed to with the Crown, Ngā Taonga said "From the outset, none of these targets were achievable. This is because they were founded on unrealistic expectations that Ngā Taonga was in possession of the necessary funding, resourcing, equipment, digital storage and infrastructure at the point of transfer and onwards, when this was not the case."

=== 2018 - 2019 ===
In July 2018 Chief Executive Rebecca Elvy told RNZ that by itself, the archive could only digitise 1,000 - 1,500 Betacam titles per year and that they would like to do a lot more by bringing in an external party who would "bring their own equipment".

That same month, Chair of Nga Taonga Simon Murdoch signed an extension of the 2014 Memorandum of Understanding with the Associate Minister for Arts, Culture and Heritage Grant Robertson for the period 1 July 2018 – 30 June 2019. One of the major differences with the earlier MoU was the reduction of digitisation and access targets: now only 1,500 titles would need to be preserved and made available online "provided that rights are clear". The $2 million funding for the management of the TVNZ Archive collection remained unchanged.

== Other access points ==
=== Chapman Archive (University of Auckland) ===
The Chapman archive began as a private collection of off-air broadcast recordings made by Professor Robert Chapman and his wife Noeline in the early 1960s. It subsequently became a resource of the University of Auckland's Department of Political Studies where Professor Chapman was the inaugural Professor. The archive's aim is to maintain "a collection that reflects New Zealand's political, social, cultural and economic history as shown through broadcast media". Since 1984 the archive has been visually capturing, among other things, TVNZ news and current affairs programming. Ngā Taonga has worked with the Chapman Archive to digitise over 13,000 news and current affairs programmes - including TVNZ content.

=== Digital Production Library (TVNZ) ===
Television New Zealand operates an internal Digital Production Library (DPL). It contains nearly 30,000 hours of news content that has been digitised from Beta SP tape by the broadcaster. As the content is commercially sensitive and subject to licensing arrangements through Getty Images, Ngā Taonga needs to seek permission from TVNZ before placing any of the items online.

=== NZ On Screen ===
Over 900 titles from the TVNZ Archive collection currently feature on NZ On Screen, a state-funded online promotional showcase of New Zealand television and film. The website allows users to view and comment on the streaming content. Earlier versions of the website credit the TVNZ Archive as the provider of much of the TVNZ content. However, in current versions of the website the source for those titles is attributed to Ngā Taonga Sound & Vision.

In the Strategic Plan 2016-2024 published in mid-2016, Ngā Taonga Sound & Vision wanted to collaborate with NZ On Screen and the NZ Film Commission to establish a "collaborative one-stop-online-shop for New Zealand film and broadcast content." However, by January 2017 an internal memorandum from the Ministry for Culture and Heritage noted that Ngā Taonga Sound & Vision Chair Jane Kominik and Chief Executive Rebecca Elvy met with the Minister for Arts, Culture and Heritage Maggie Barry in November 2016. Ngā Taonga Sound & Vision felt strongly that it should be responsible for the operation of the NZ On Screen website. Both the funding agency NZ On Air and the Digital Media Trust who operates NZ On Screen, saw no reason to change the current arrangement. The Chair of Digital Media Trust wrote to Ms Kominik to express his concerns about Ngā Taonga Sound & Vision's objectives.

Subsequently, a Memorandum of Understanding was signed in 2017 between the Digital Media Trust and Ngā Taonga Sound & Vision to work together to "maximise online public access to New Zealand's audiovisual content and heritage".

In December 2017 an online petition was launched to advocate for NZ On Screen to be supplied with the TVNZ Archive titles digitised by Ngā Taonga Sound & Vision. This approach aimed to bypass the TVNZ/Ngā Taonga Sound & Vision database dispute and allow for the digitised titles to be placed online. The petition organisers noted that they were a group of private citizens, coming together under the name Campaign for Preservation and Access to our Taonga. They had no affiliation with Ngā Taonga Sound & Vision, TVNZ or NZ On Screen.

The petition followed on from the Ministry for Culture and Heritage's acknowledgment that after three years, Ngā Taonga Sound & Vision had digitised 2,139 titles from the TVNZ Archive, with 0 titles having made it online. The petition pointed to the NZ On Screen website, noting how it already contained over 900 TVNZ titles. The petition called on the Minister of Broadcasting Clare Curran and the Minister for Arts, Culture and Heritage Jacinda Ardern to provide NZ On Screen with both the digital files and additional funding so that it could provide public access to the TVNZ Archive collection.
