= Ministry for Culture and Heritage =

Government ministry of New Zealand

- Māori: Manatū Taonga

Agency overview
- Formed: 1 September 1999
- Preceding agency: Ministry of Cultural Affairs
- Jurisdiction: New Zealand Government
- Headquarters: Public Trust Building, Wellington
- Annual budget: ▲NZ$364,202,838
- Minister responsible: Paul Goldsmith, MP, Minister for Arts, Culture and Heritage
- Agency executive: Laulu Mac Leauanae, CEO
- Child agency: NZ On Air
- Website: mch.govt.nz

The Ministry for Culture and Heritage (MCH; Māori: Manatū Taonga) is the department of the New Zealand Government responsible for supporting the arts, culture, built heritage, sport and recreation, and broadcasting sectors in New Zealand and advising government on such.

== History ==
The Ministry of Cultural Affairs had been created in 1991; prior to this, the Department of Internal Affairs (DIA) had provided oversight and support for arts and culture functions.

MCH was founded in 1999 with the merger of the former Ministry of Cultural Affairs and the history and heritage functions of the DIA, as well as some functions from the Department of Conservation and Ministry of Commerce. The purpose of the merger of functions and departments was to create a coherent, non-fragmented overview of the cultural and heritage sector, rather than spreading services and functions across several departments.

Minister for Cultural Affairs Marie Hasler oversaw the transition of functions into the new agency. Opposition Labour MP Judith Tizard, who would later serve as an Associate Minister for the ministry in the Fifth Labour Government of New Zealand, accused the restructure of being "all hype, no substance," lacking the funding and human resource necessary to be effective.

At the time of its establishment, the minister responsible for the ministry was the Minister for Culture and Heritage. This position is now titled the Minister for Arts, Culture and Heritage.

=== Cutbacks under Sixth National Government, 2023–present ===
In April 2024, the Ministry proposed reducing its workforce from 184 to 150 roles to meet Government budgetary cutbacks. Of the 34 affected net roles, 23 were already vacant while 11 would be redundancies.

In mid-June 2025, the Ministry proposed slashing 24 jobs (15 percent of its workforce) after the 2025 New Zealand budget reduced its budget by NZ$2 million. These proposed cuts include laying off three of its seven historians and most of its digital production roles. Historian Jock Phillips expressed concerns that these job cuts would affect educational websites run by the Ministry. An unidentified Ministry official also expressed concern that the cutbacks would affect its community engagement including school groups, the iwi/tribal-led Te Tai Whakaea Treaty Settlement Stories and Pacific Histories programmes. In late July 2025, the Ministry confirmed plans to cut 26 roles including four senior historians. However, work would continue on the Te Ara: The Encyclopedia of New Zealand website and complete work on a history of the Dawn Raids. In response, the Public Service Association's national secretary Fleur Fitzsimons described the cutbacks as "cultural vandalism".

In late July 2025, former chief Department of Internal Affairs historian and former chief editor of Te Ara Jock Phillips expressed concern that NZ$8 million worth of budget cuts to the Ministry for Culture and Heritage could undermine the operational viability of the online Te Ara: Encyclopedia of New Zealand. On 4 September 2025, the Ministry confirmed plans to disestablish two historians based at the war memorial education centre in Pukeahu by December 2025. These historians are responsible for teaching children about the New Zealand Wars, the Gallipoli campaign and the Vietnam War. In addition, the Ministry confirmed plans to disestablish the carillonist responsible for playing the bells at Pukeahu National War Memorial Park.

== Functions ==
The ministry advises the government on policies and issues relating to the arts, culture, heritage, sport and recreation, and broadcasting sectors. It funds 17 other agencies which also support these sectors, looks after war monuments and memorials and war graves throughout New Zealand, and is involved in a number of projects promoting and documenting New Zealand history.

=== Agencies ===
- Creative New Zealand (Arts Council of New Zealand)
- New Zealand Music Commission
- New Zealand Symphony Orchestra
- Royal New Zealand Ballet
- Te Matatini Society Inc.
- Broadcasting Standards Authority
- New Zealand Film Commission
- NZ on Air
- Radio New Zealand International
- Antarctic Heritage Trust
- Heritage New Zealand
- Museum of New Zealand Te Papa Tongarewa (Te Papa)
- Ngā Taonga Sound & Vision
- Pukaki Trust
- Te Māori Manaaki Taonga Trust
- Drug Free Sport New Zealand
- Sport New Zealand

=== Guardianship ===
In 2014 the ministry became the guardian of the TVNZ Archive collection on behalf of the crown. It appointed Ngā Taonga Sound & Vision as the initial archive manager. The TVNZ Archive collection contains over 600,000 hours of television spanning almost 55 years of New Zealand's public television history. It includes iconic New Zealand content such as documentaries, dramas, sports programmes and every TVNZ news broadcast from December 1986 to 2014. In a 2014 briefing to Minister Craig Foss, the ministry noted that the long-term preservation of the TVNZ Archive collection did not align with the broadcaster's business needs and that transferring the collection to the crown would allow for the proper preservation of the collection. Both the ministry and TVNZ explicitly wanted to ensure the archive was preserved and that it was made increasingly available for re-use through online streaming and other means.

=== History and heritage ===
The ministry supports research into and promotion of New Zealand history. This includes publication of New Zealand history books and e-books, and a number of websites. The ministry's managed sites include:

- New Zealand History (NZHistory)
- Te Ara: The Encyclopedia of New Zealand
- Dictionary of New Zealand Biography
- Ngā Tapuwae Trails
- WW100, New Zealand's official First World War centenary programme
- Landmarks Whenua Tohunga

David Green, a historian working for the ministry, discovered that significantly more New Zealand personnel were engaged in the Gallipoli Campaign than had been recorded in Fred Waite's official history, The New Zealanders at Gallipoli. Waite's number of some 8,500 men was corrected to approximately 18,000 in September 2013.

Tohu Whenua Landmarks that tell our stories is a partnership between MCH, the Department of Conservation Te Papa Atawhai, Heritage New Zealand Pouhere Taonga and the Ministry of Business, Innovation and Employment. The programme promotes and encourages people to visit New Zealand's historically and culturally important places. Landmarks has been launched so far in Northland and Otago.

=== Legislation ===
The ministry is responsible for overseeing dozens of current acts and regulations. These include:

- Administering the following Orders in Council:
  - Canterbury Earthquake (Historic Places Act) Order 2011
  - Television New Zealand (Separation of Transmission Business) Order 2003
  - Historic Places Trust Elections Regulations 1993
- Administering the following Acts of Parliament:
  - Broadcasting Act 1989
  - Television New Zealand Act 2003
  - Protected Objects Act 1975
  - Historic Places Act 1993
  - National War Memorial Act 1992
  - Radio New Zealand Act 1995
  - Anzac Day Act 1966
  - New Zealand Film Commission Act 1978
  - Flags, Emblems, and Names Protection Act 1981
  - Archives, Culture, and Heritage Reform Act 2000
  - Museum of New Zealand Te Papa Tongarewa Act 1992
  - Arts Council of New Zealand Toi Aotearoa Act 1994
  - New Zealand Film Commission Act 1978
- Consultation responsibilities under many acts relating the Treaty of Waitangi settlements.
  - Port Nicholson Block (Taranaki Whānui ki Te Upoko o Te Ika) Claims Settlement Act 2009
  - Ngaa Rauru Kiitahi Claims Settlement Act 2005

== Ministers ==
The ministry serves three portfolios and two ministers.

Officeholder	Portfolio(s)	Other responsibilities
Paul Goldsmith	Lead Minister (Ministry for Culture and Heritage); Minister for Arts, Culture and Heritage; Minister for Media and Communications	
Mark Mitchell	Minister for Sport and Recreation	
