= 2018 Birthday Honours (New Zealand) =

Awards list for New Zealand

2018 Queen's Birthday Honours
- Previous: 2018 New Year Honours; Next: 2019 New Year Honours
- Type: New Zealand royal honours: New Zealand Order of Merit; Queen's Service Order; Queen's Service Medal; Distinguished Service Decoration; New Zealand Bravery Decoration; New Zealand Bravery Medal
- Date: 4 June 2018
- Country: New Zealand
- Total recipients: 192

The 2018 Queen's Birthday Honours in New Zealand, celebrating the official birthday of Queen Elizabeth II, were appointments made by the Queen in her right as Queen of New Zealand, on the advice of the New Zealand government, to various orders and honours to reward and highlight good works by New Zealanders. They were announced on 4 June 2018.

The recipients of honours are listed here as they were styled before their new honour.

== New Zealand Order of Merit ==
=== Dame Companion (DNZM) ===
- Catherine Alice Healy – of Lower Hutt. For services to the rights of sex workers.
- The Honourable Luamanuvao Winifred Alexandra Laban QSO – of Lower Hutt. For services to education and the Pacific community.
- Emeritus Professor Charmian Jocelyn O'Connor CBE JP – of Auckland. For services to education and chemistry.
- Julie Bethridge Topp MNZM – of Auckland. For services to entertainment.
- Lynda Bethridge Topp MNZM – of Ashburton. For services to entertainment.
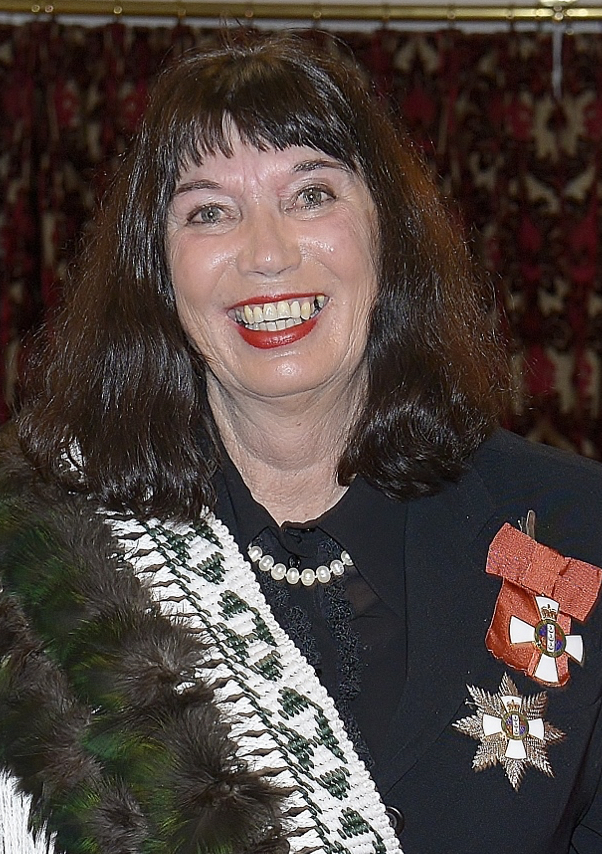
Dame Catherine Healy

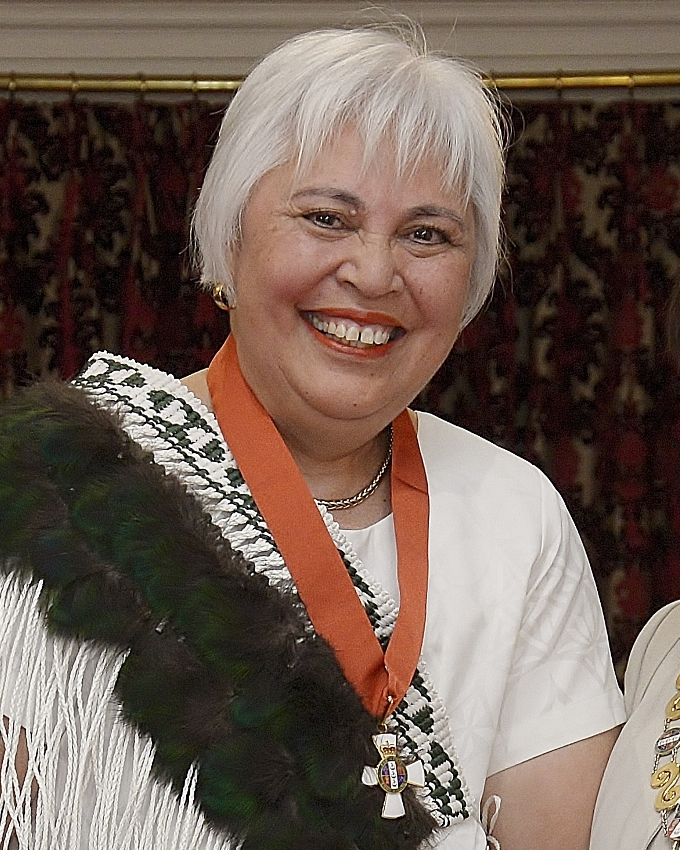
Dame Winnie Laban

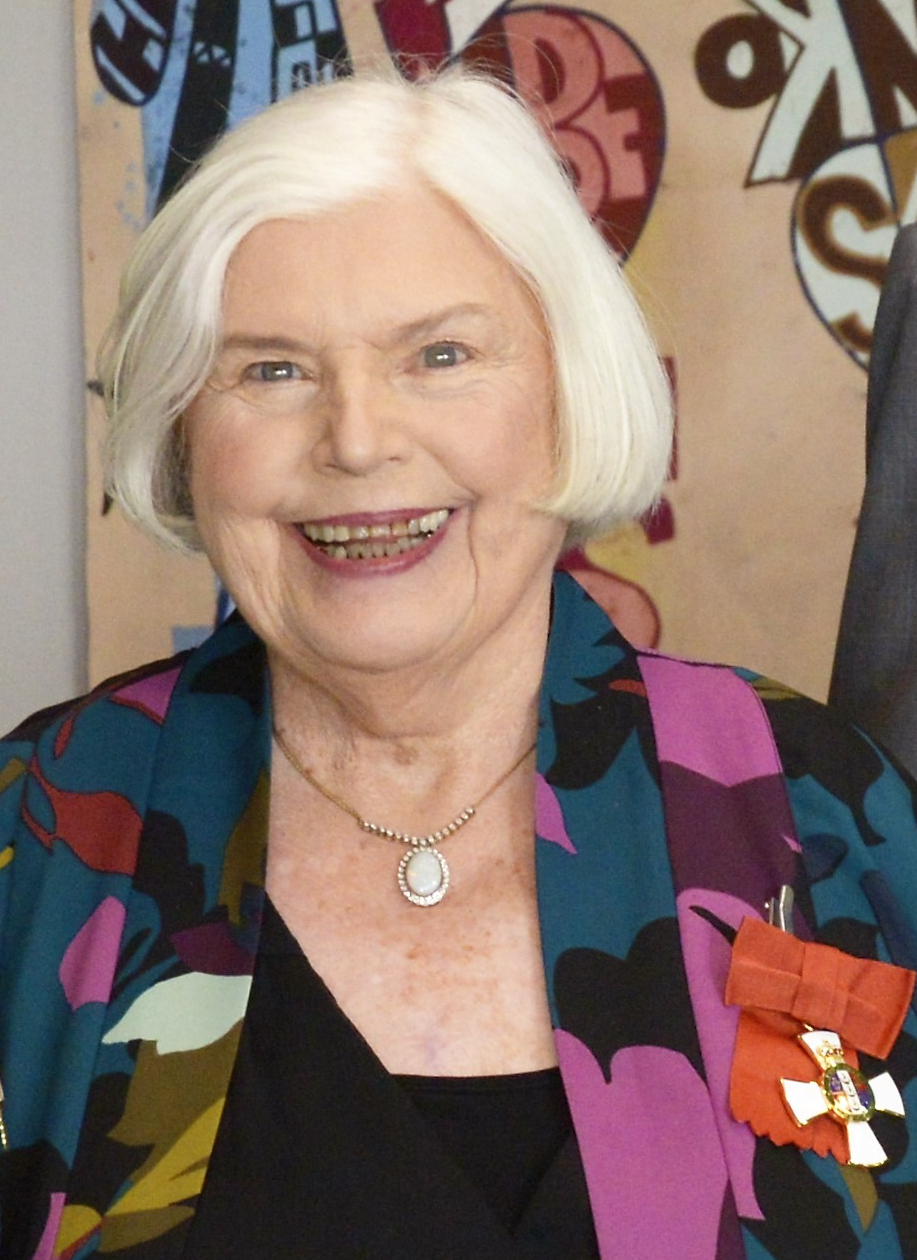
Dame Charmian O'Connor

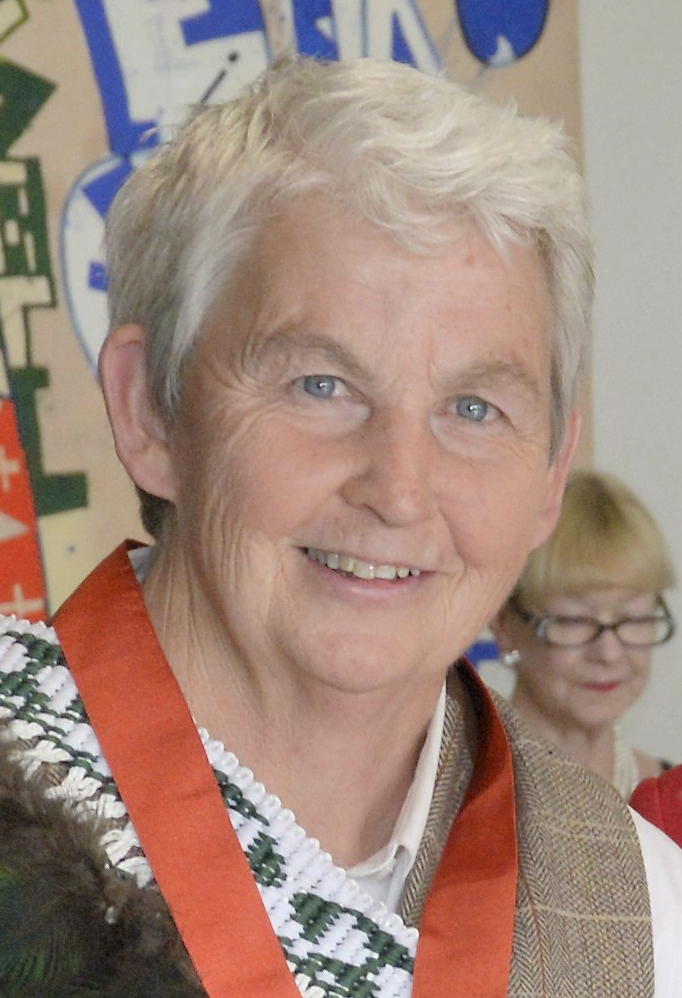
Dame Jools Topp

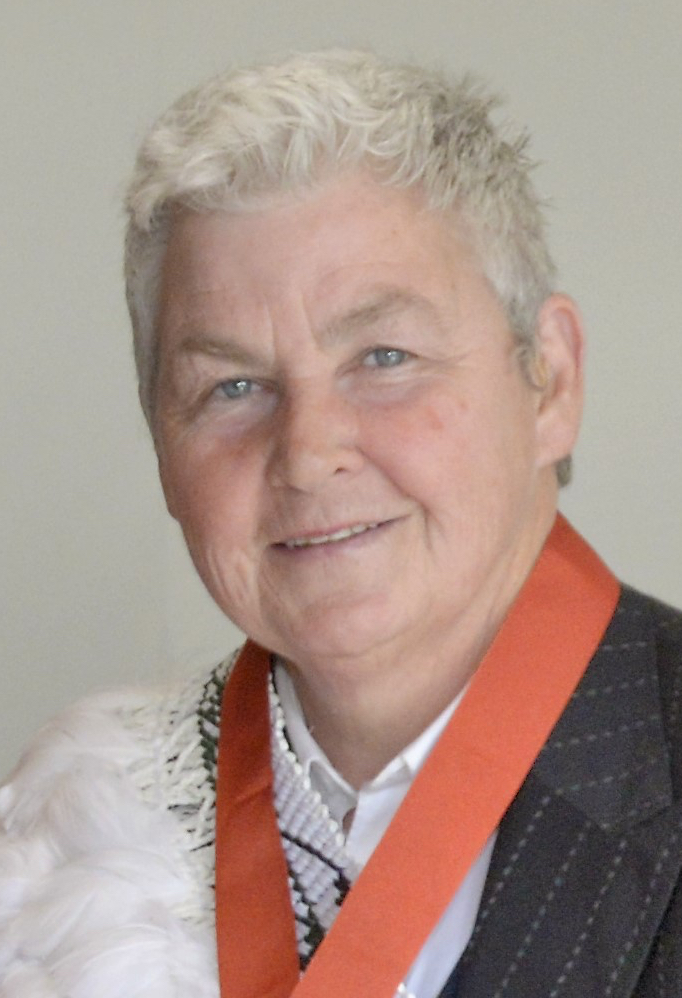
Dame Lynda Topp

=== Knight Companion (KNZM) ===
- Hekenukumai Puhipi Busby ONZM MBE – of Kaitaia. For services to Māori.
- The Right Honourable Simon William English – of Wellington. For services to the State.
- John Edward Rowles OBE – of Auckland. For services to entertainment.
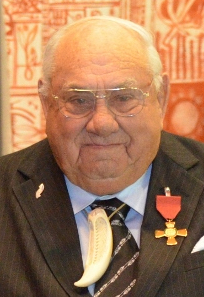
Sir Hec Busby

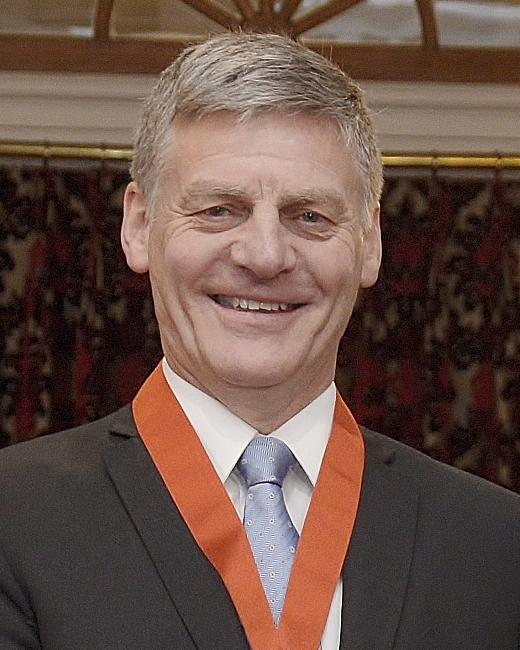
Sir Bill English

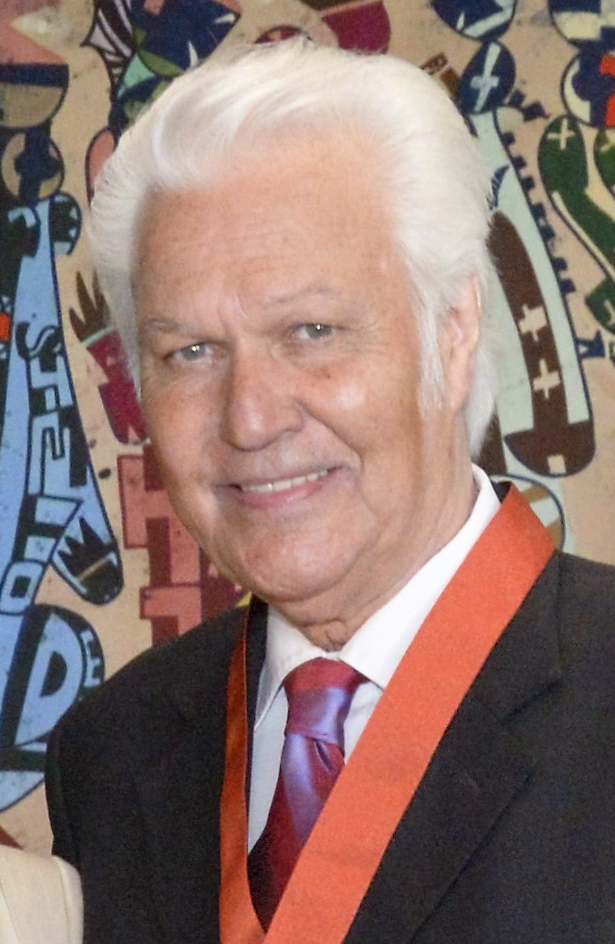
Sir John Rowles

=== Companion (CNZM) ===
- Elizabeth Margaret Bang MNZM JP – of Hamilton. For services to health, women and the community.
- Kristine Robyn Bartlett – of Lower Hutt. For services to equal pay advocacy.
- Richard Andrew Griffin – of Māpua. For services to broadcasting and the media industry.
- Kenneth Nigel Hampton OBE QC – of Christchurch. For services to the law.
- William Bryce Johnson – of Upper Hutt. For services to conservation and the environment.
- Dr Amanda Margaret Meredith Oakley – of Hamilton. For services to dermatology.
- Faye Patricia Sumner – of Auckland. For services to the medical technology sector.
- Barry Charles Thomas – of Queenstown. For services to tourism and business.
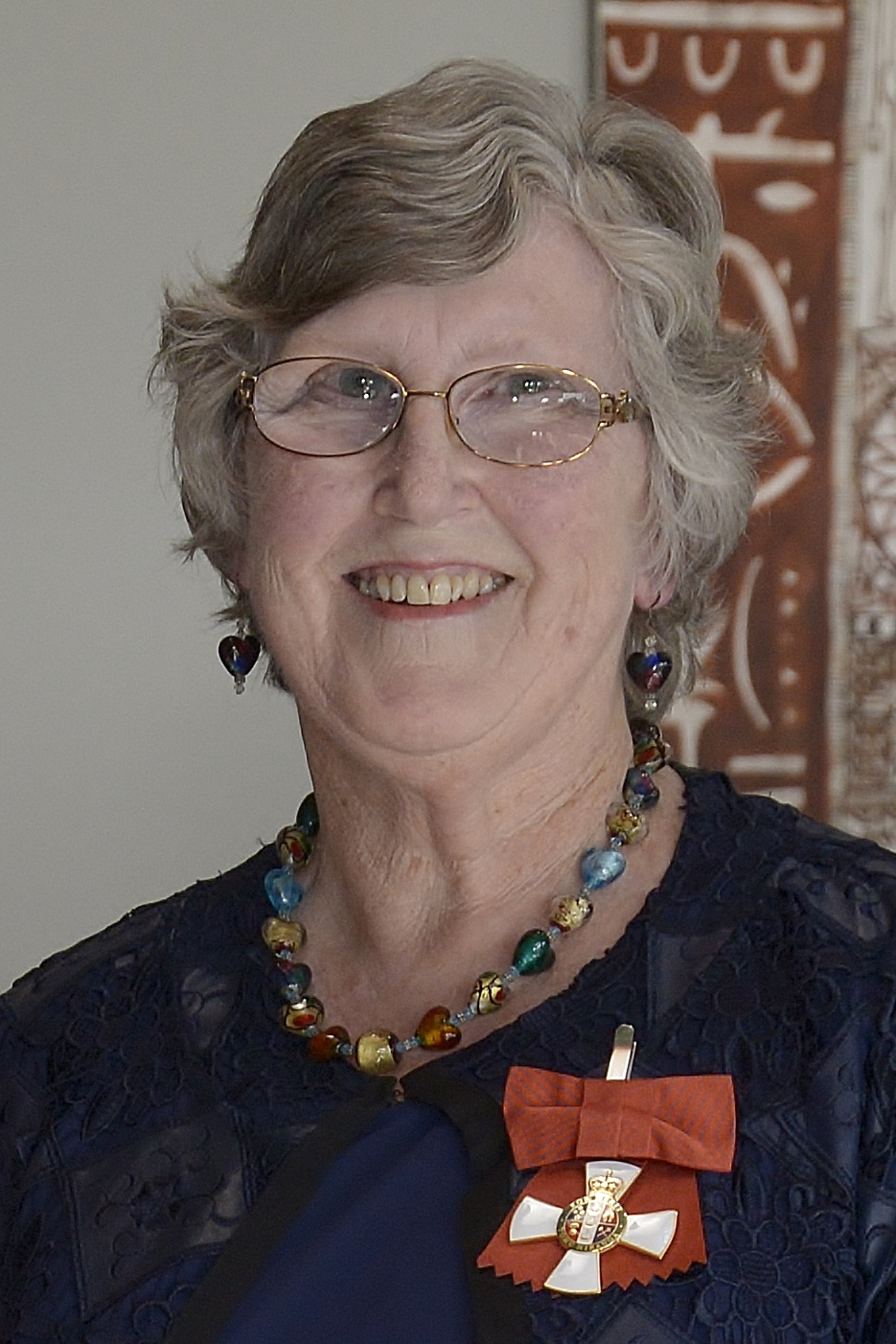
Elizabeth Bang

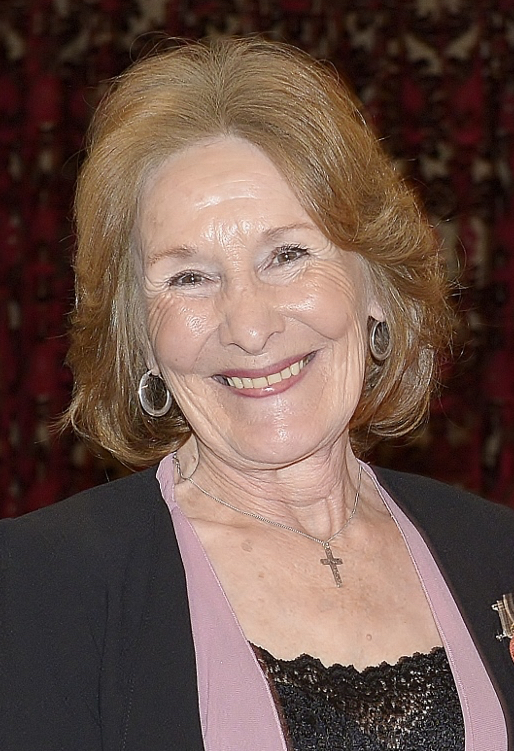
Kristine Bartlett

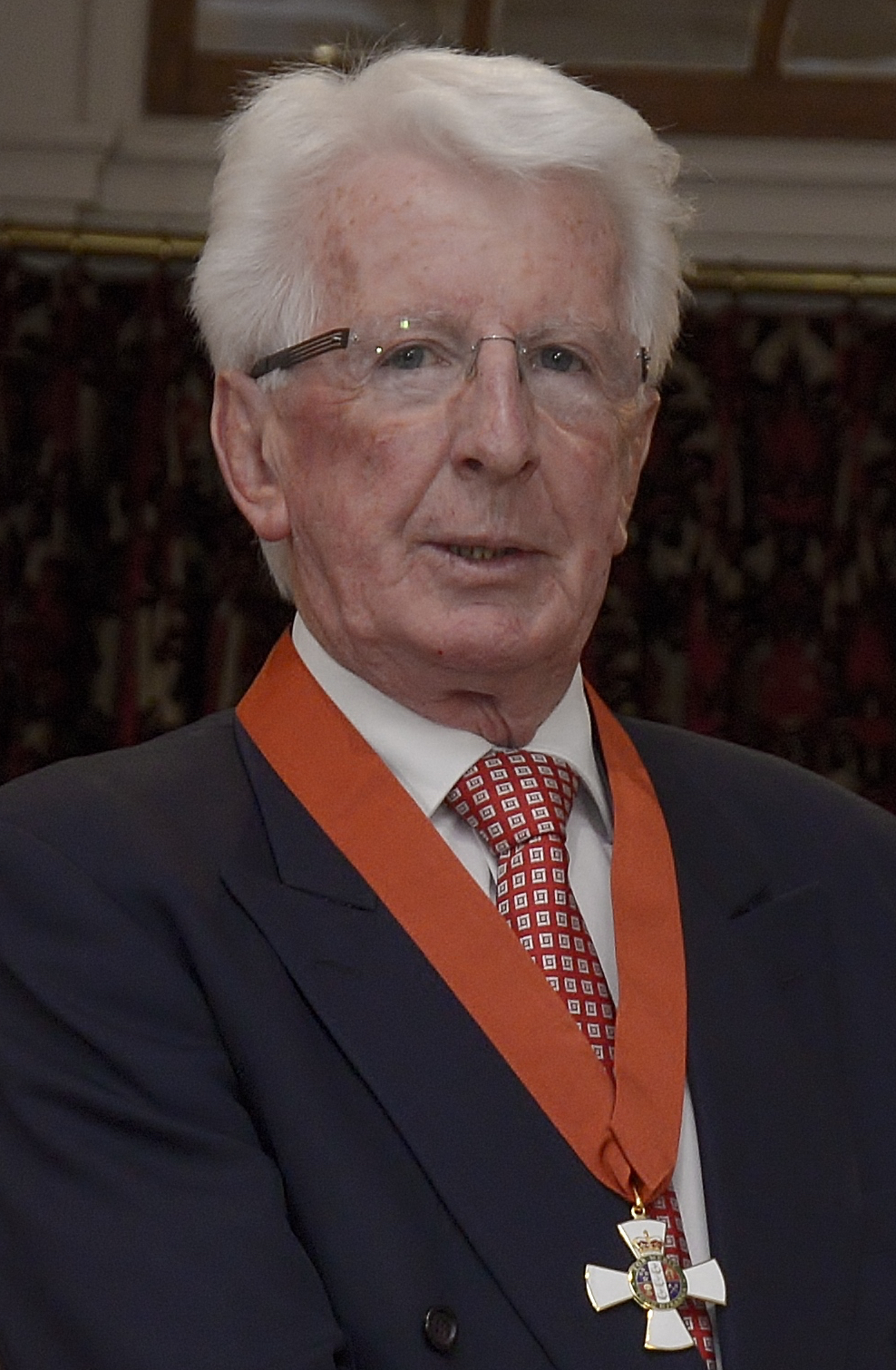
Richard Griffin

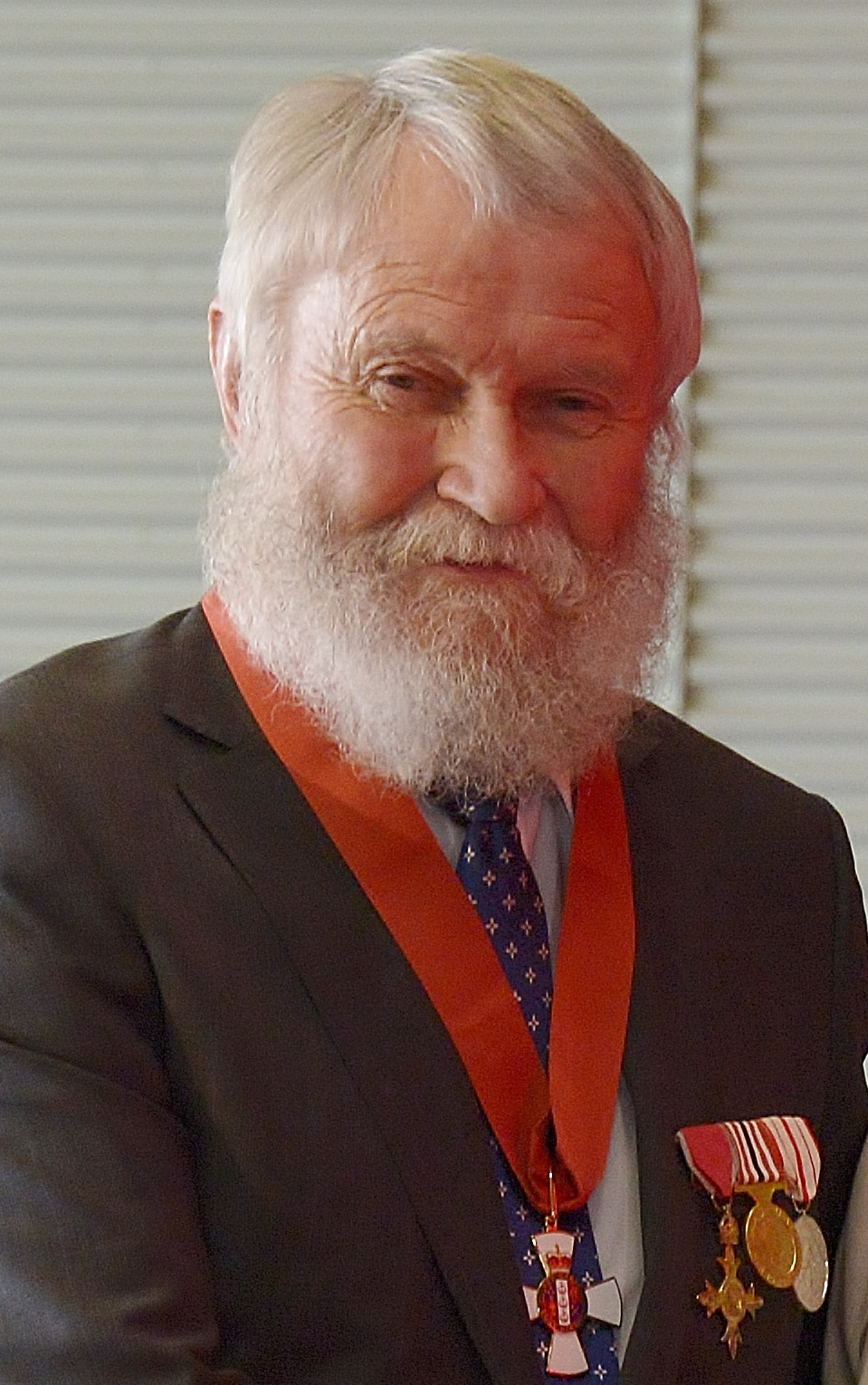
Nigel Hampton

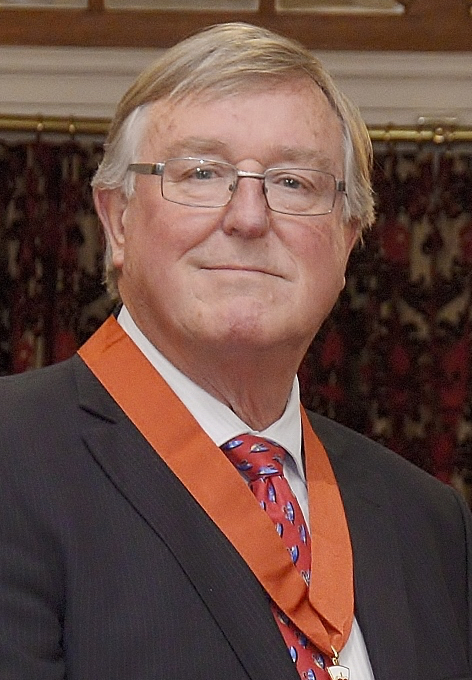
Bryce Johnson

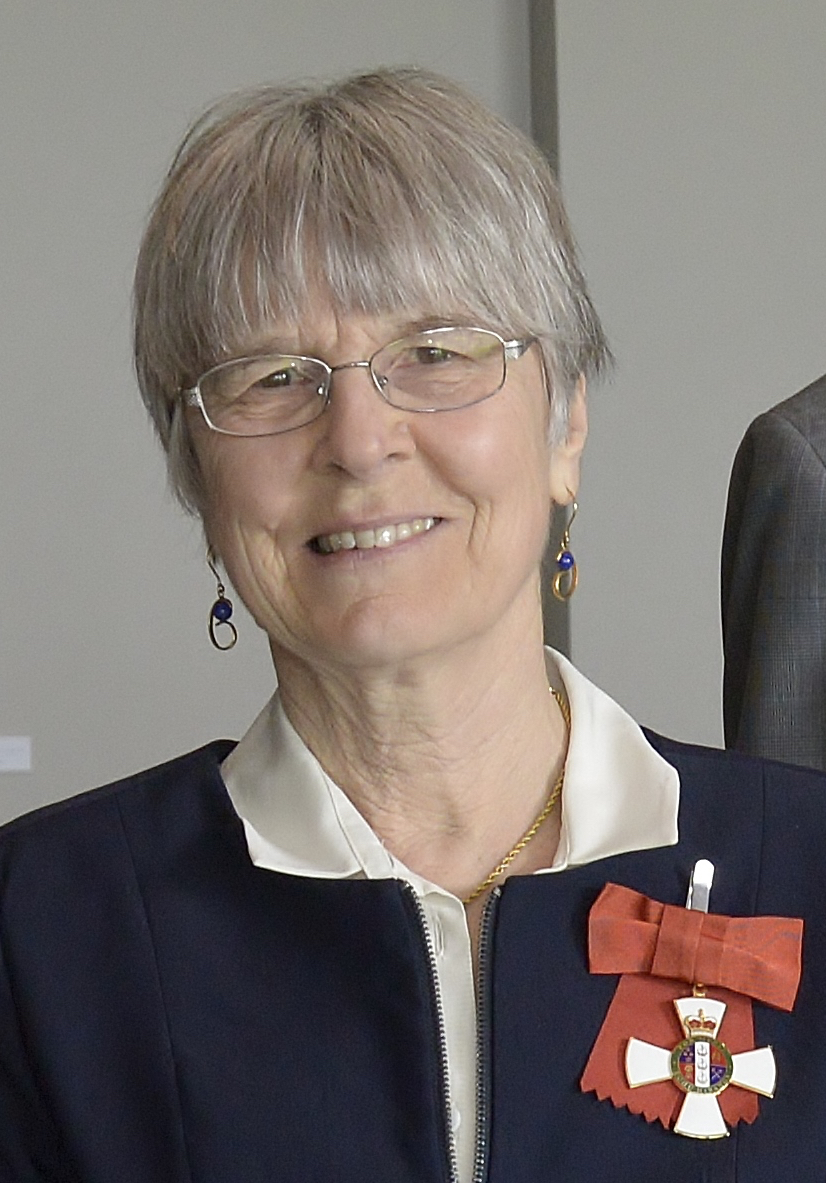
Amanda Oakley

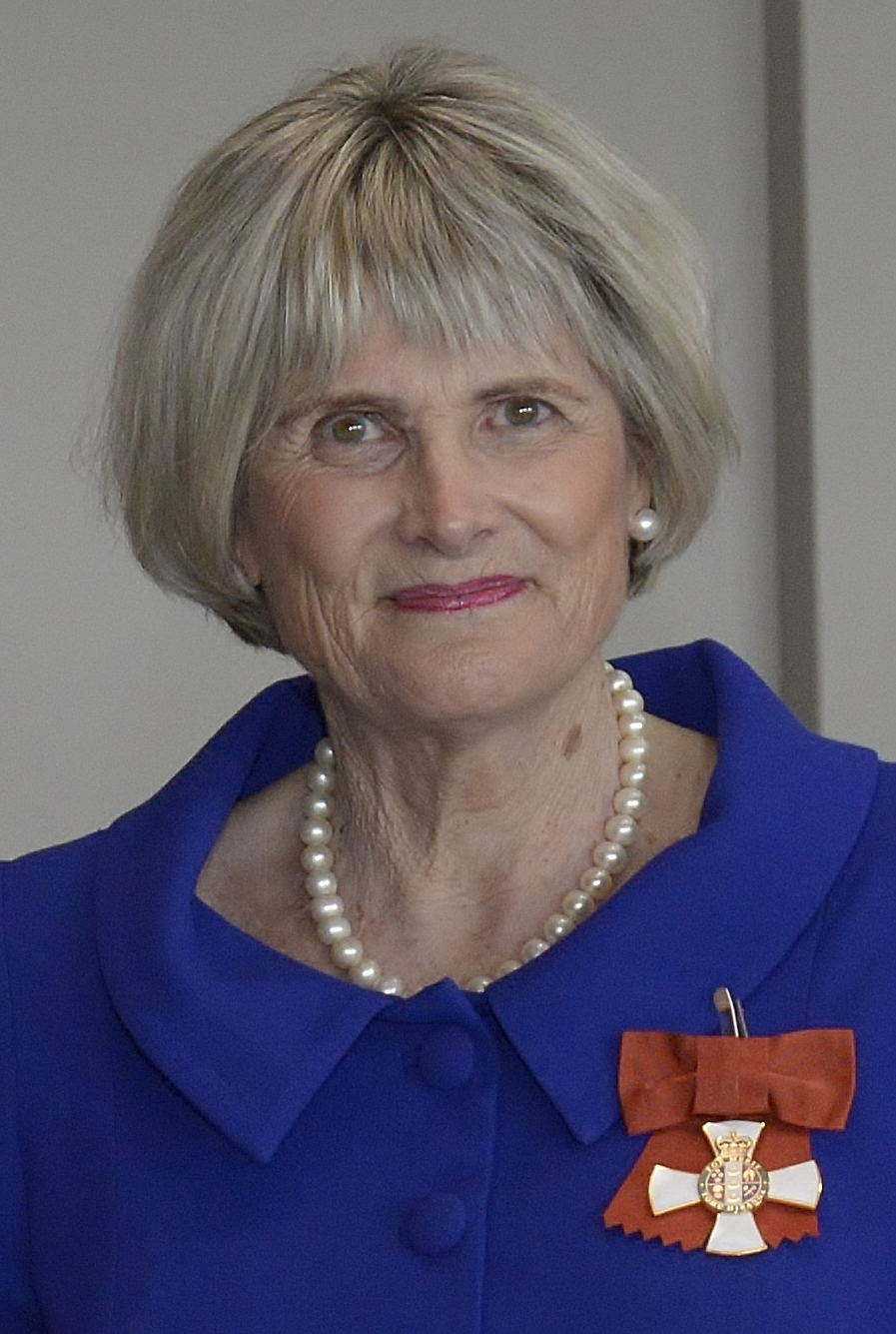
Faye Sumner

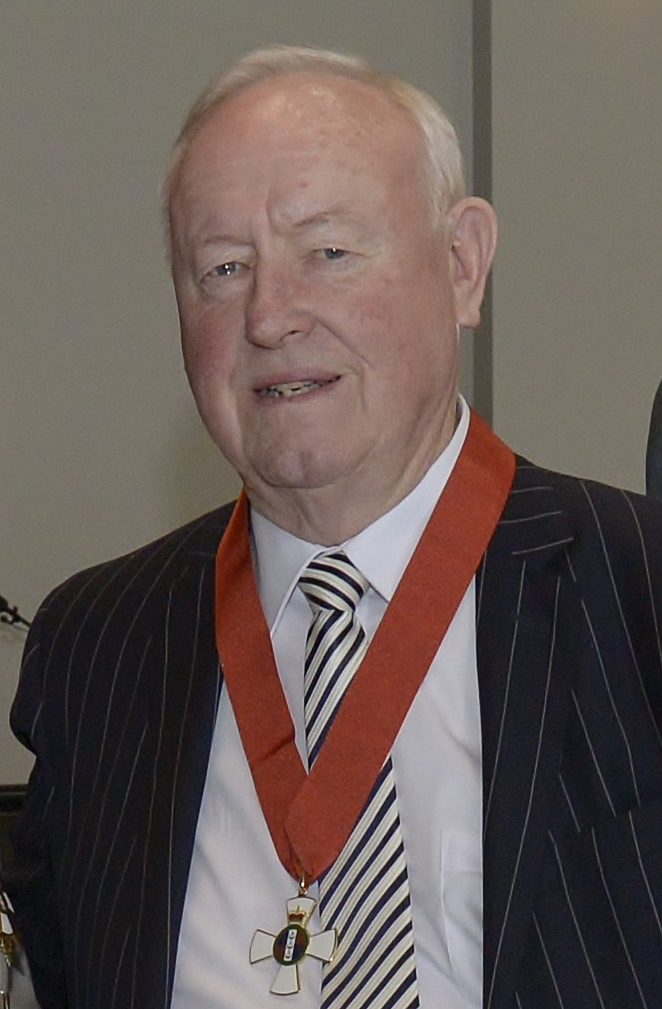
Barry Thomas

=== Officer (ONZM) ===
- Fiona Kathryn Allan – of Auckland. For services to Paralympic sport.
- Kathleen Marie Baker – of Whanganui. For services to lifesaving and swimming.
- Professor Spencer Wynyard Beasley – of Christchurch. For services to paediatrics.
- Philip Alexander Te-Aorangi Bell – of Auckland. For services to music.
- Geoffrey Scott Blanks – of Auckland. For services to comedy.
- Christine Barney Arihia Brears – of Taumarunui. For services to Māori and health.
- Timua Te Puhi Kai Ariki Brennan – of Rotorua. For services to music and Māori performing arts.
- Matutaera Te Nana Clendon – of Auckland. For services to Māori.
- Roger Lindsey Donaldson – of Santa Monica, California, United States of America. For services to film.
- Fiao'o Fa'amausili – of Auckland. For services to rugby.
- Tracey Anne Fear – of Maroochydore, Australia. For services to netball.
- Dallas Fisher – of Hamilton. For services to business, philanthropy and sport.
- Gillian Margaret Gemming – of Tauranga. For services to hockey.
- Briar Grace-Smith – of Paraparaumu. For services to theatre, film and television.
- Jacqueline Grant MNZM – of Hokitika. For services to the community.
- Rodger Phillip George Haines QC – of Auckland. For services to refugee and human rights law.
- Kirsten Louise Hellier – of Auckland. For services to sport, particularly athletics.
- Dr Gordon Phillip Hosking – of Mangawhai. For services to conservation.
- Rhonda Violet Marion Hyde – of Auckland. For services to media technology, television and film.
- Richard James Jeffery – of Takapau. For services to governance and the community.
- Robert James Kerridge MNZM KStJ JP – of Havelock North. For services to animal welfare and governance.
- Annabel Rose Langbein – of Auckland. For services as a food writer.
- Emeritus Professor Helen May Leach – of Dunedin. For services to culinary anthropology.
- Peter John Lorimer – of Wellington. For services to the State.
- Professor Robert Matthew Love – of Robina, Australia. For services to dentistry.
- Nina Catharine Nawalowalo – of Wellington. For services to theatre and Pacific culture.
- Carol Ann Ngawati – of Tauranga. For services to sport, education and Māori.
- Andrew Clifton Nicholson – of Wiltshire, United Kingdom. For services to equestrian sport.
- Associate Professor Michael Anthony O'Brien – of Auckland. For services to social policy and education.
- Larry George Parr – of Wellington. For services to film and television.
- Caren Jane Rangi – of Napier. For services to the Pacific community and governance.
- Desma Kemp Ratima JP – of Hastings. For services to Māori.
- Archdeacon Tikituterangi Raumati – of Urenui. For services to Māori and the community.
- Professor Nicola Mary Shadbolt – of Ashhurst. For services to agribusiness.
- Roger Norman Shepherd – of Wellington. For services to the music industry.
- Graeme John Titcombe – of Wellington. For services to the home support sector and the community.
- Katrina Todd – of Auckland. For services to dance.
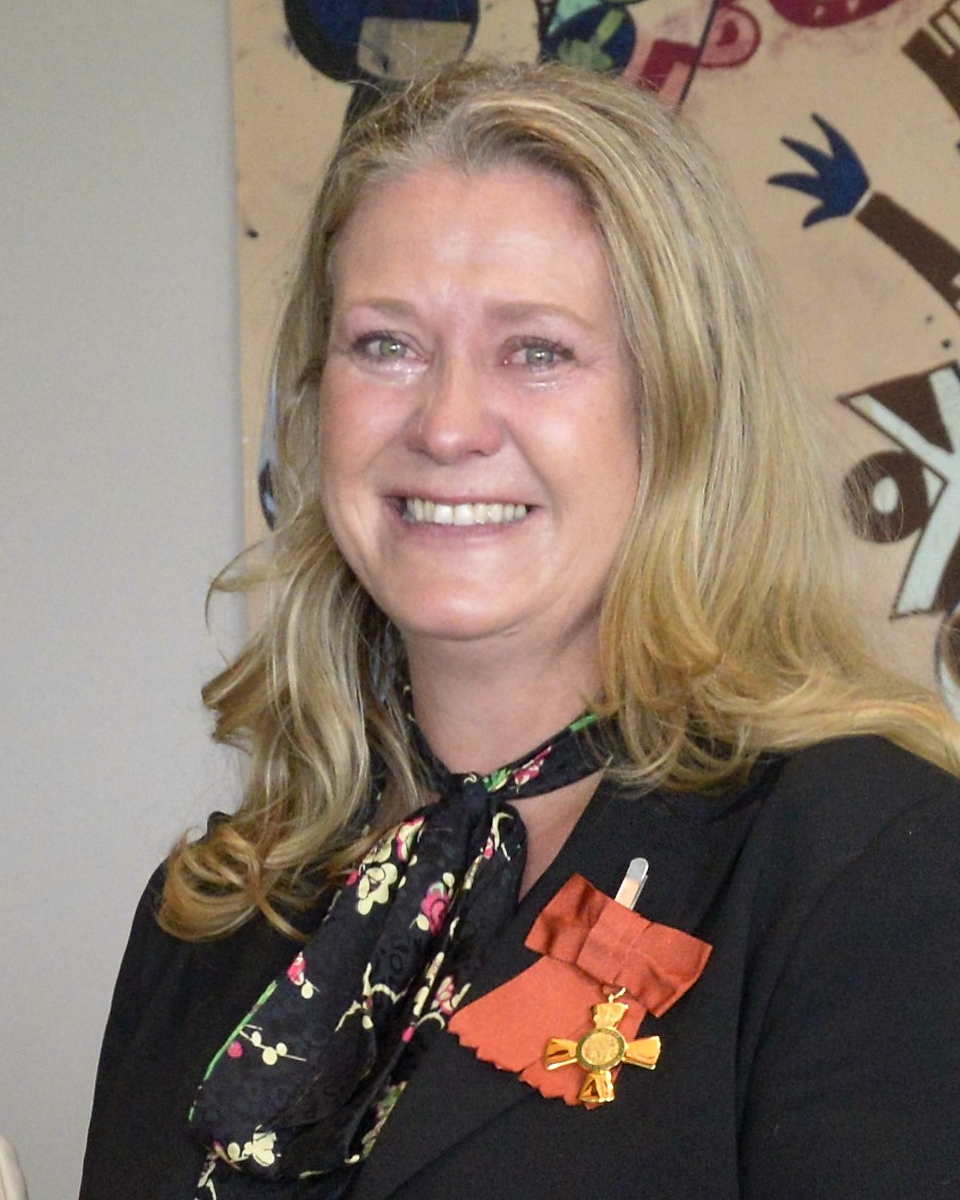
Fiona Allan

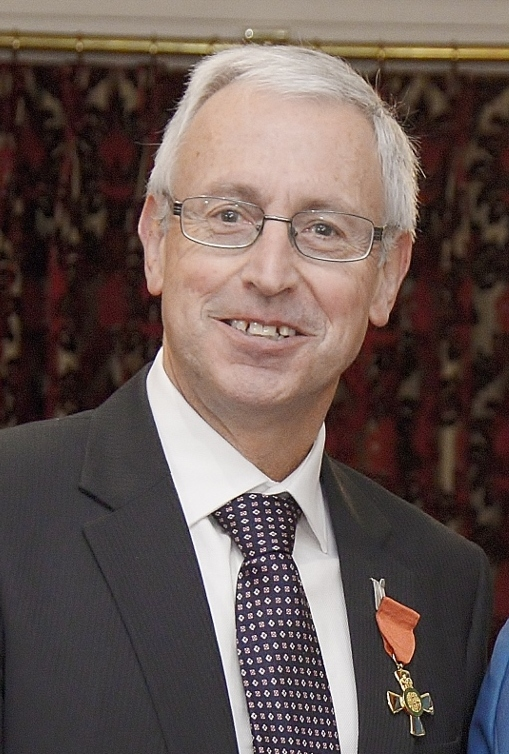
Spencer Beasley

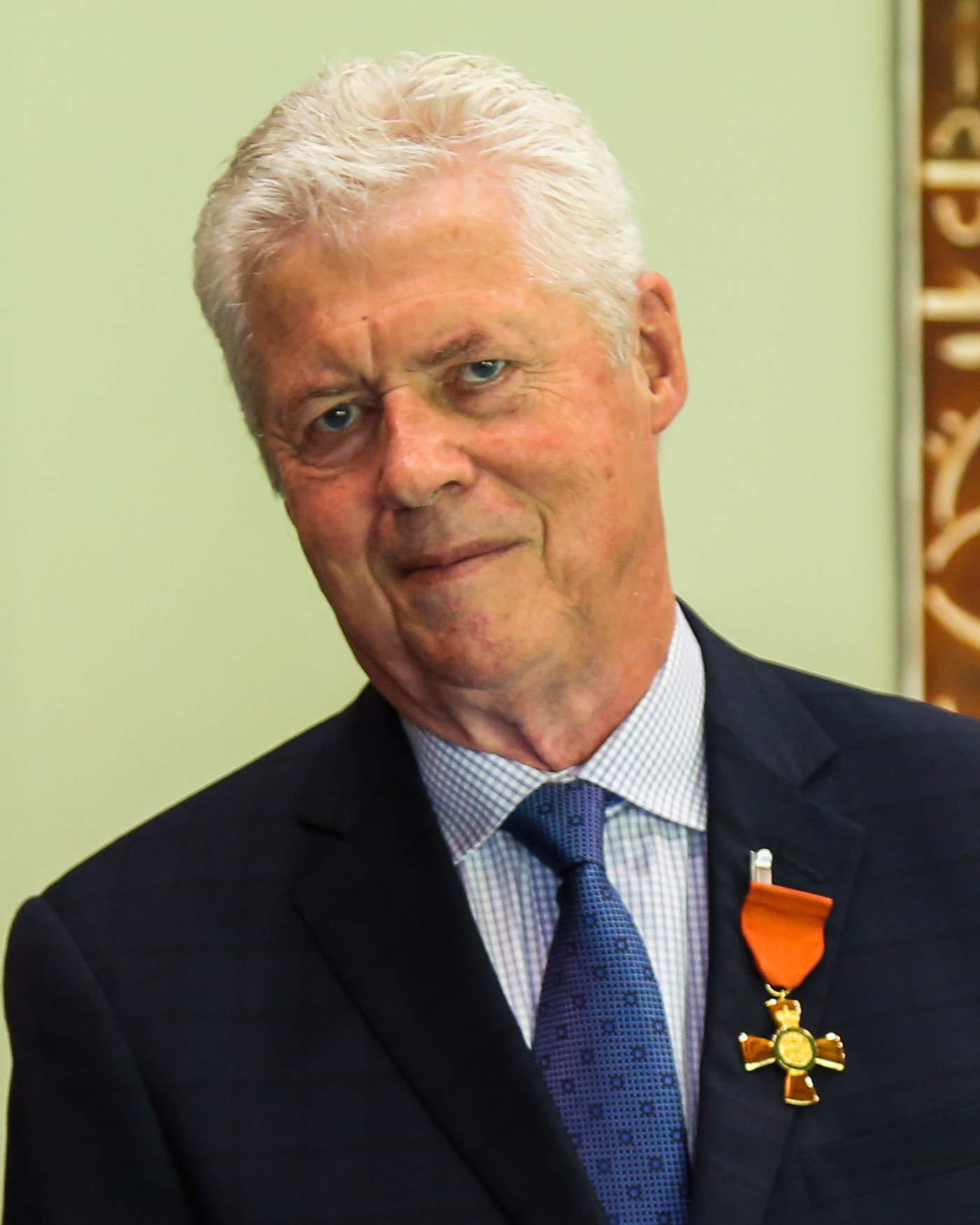
Roger Donaldson

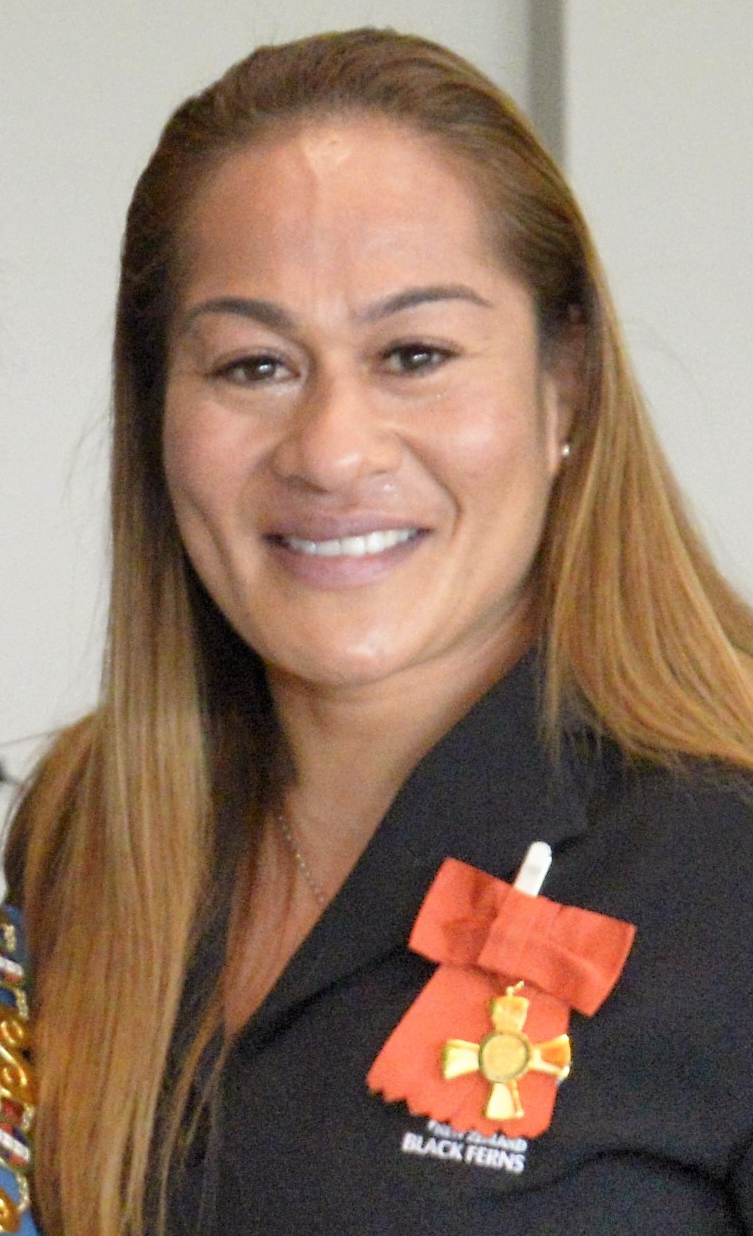
Fiao'o Fa'amausili

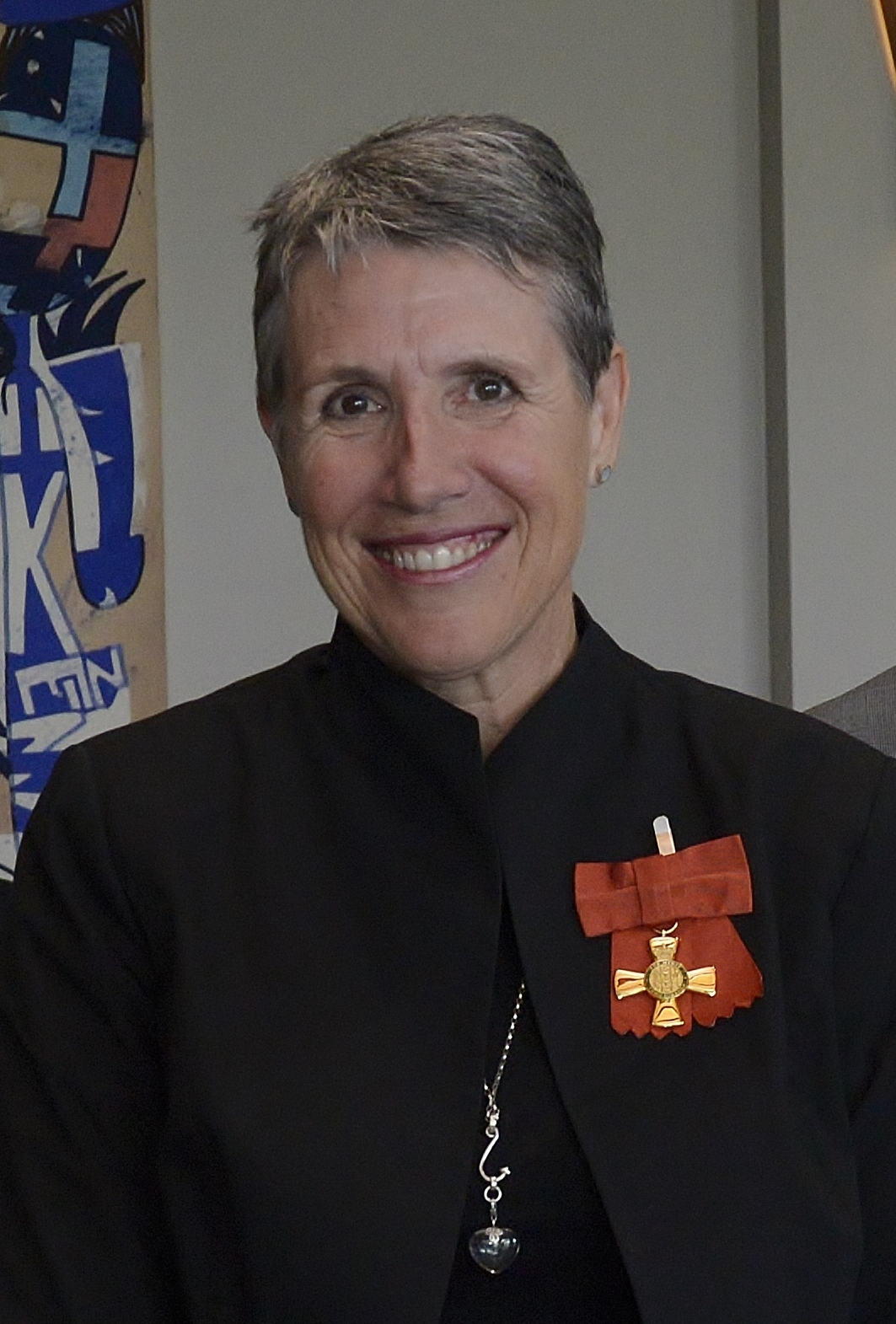
Tracey Fear

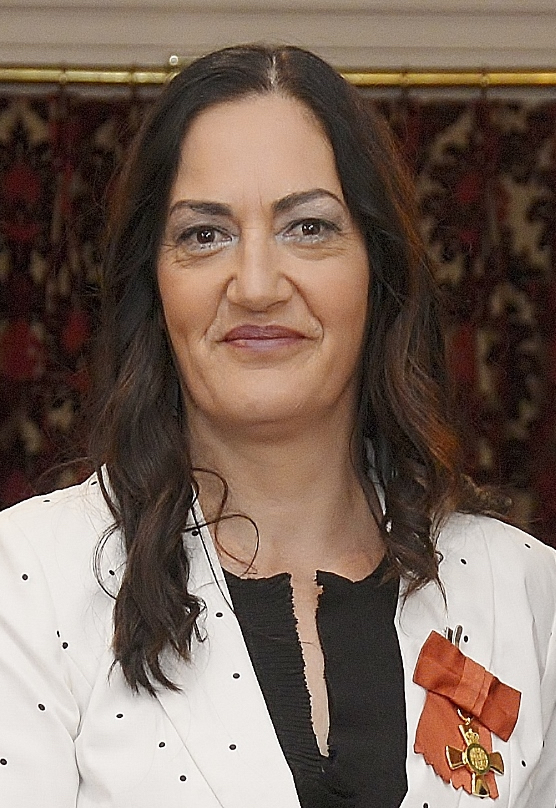
Briar Grace-Smith

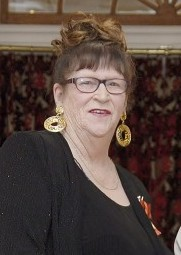
Jacquie Grant

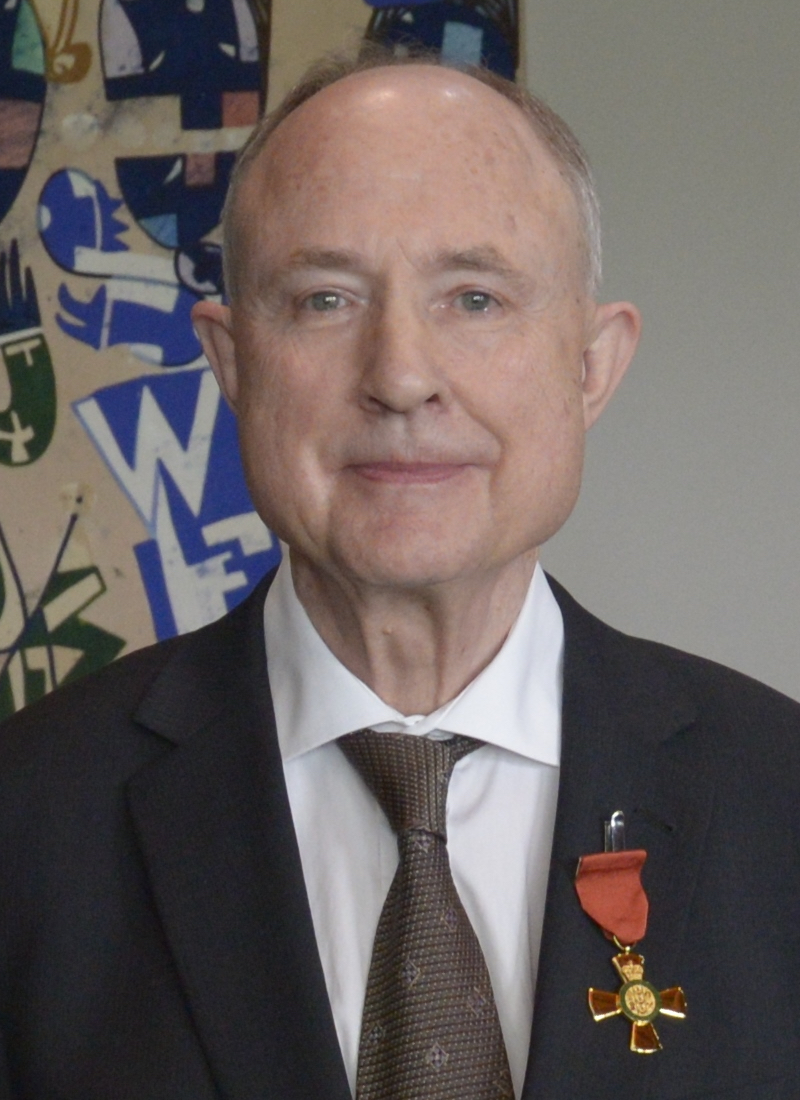
Rodger Haines

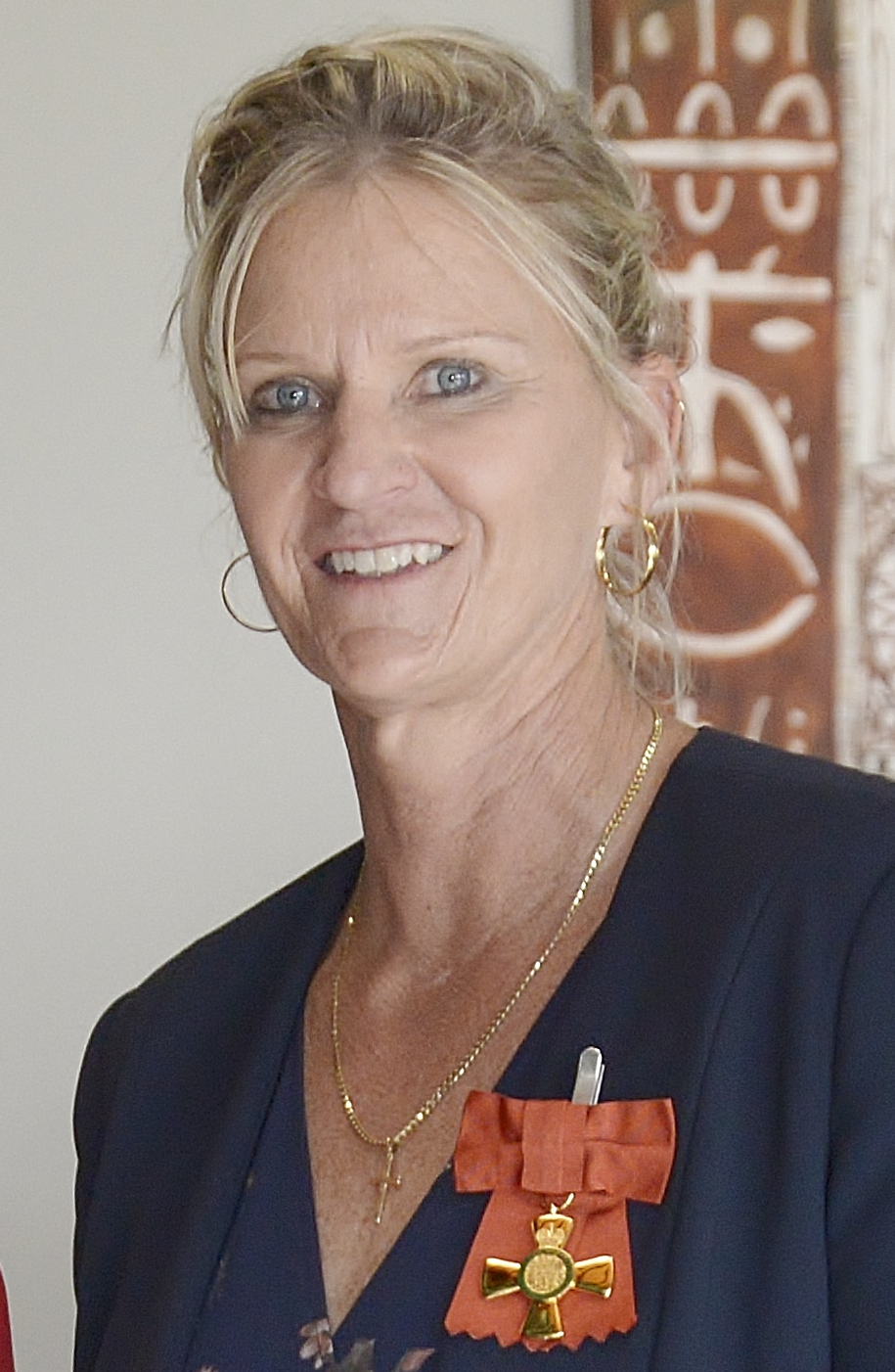
Kirsten Hellier

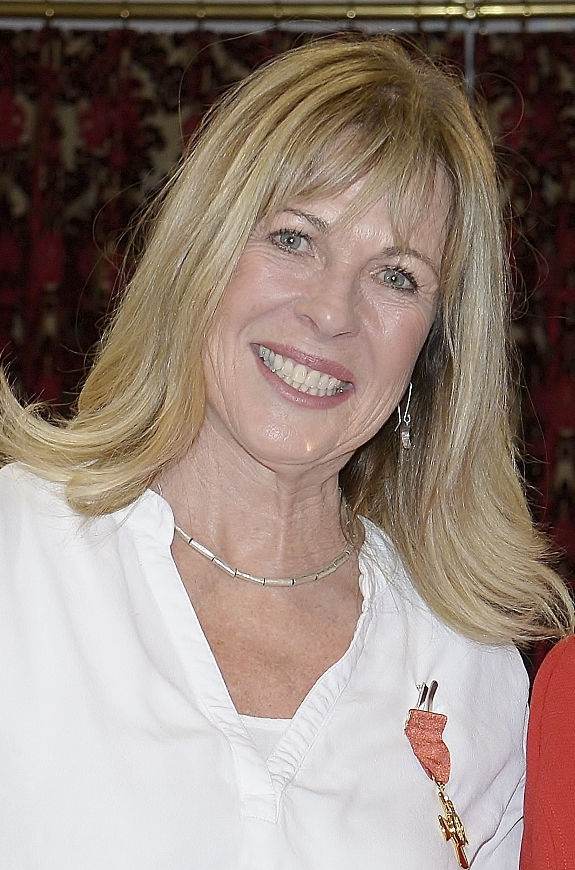
Annabel Langbein

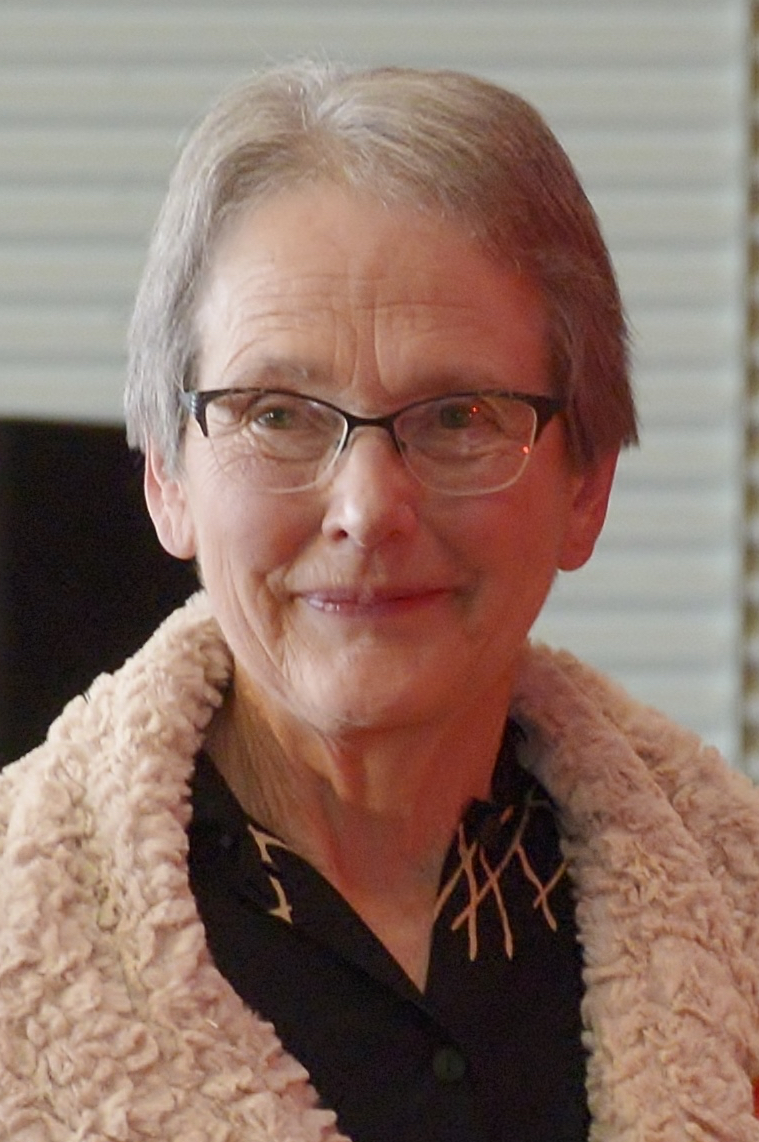
Helen Leach

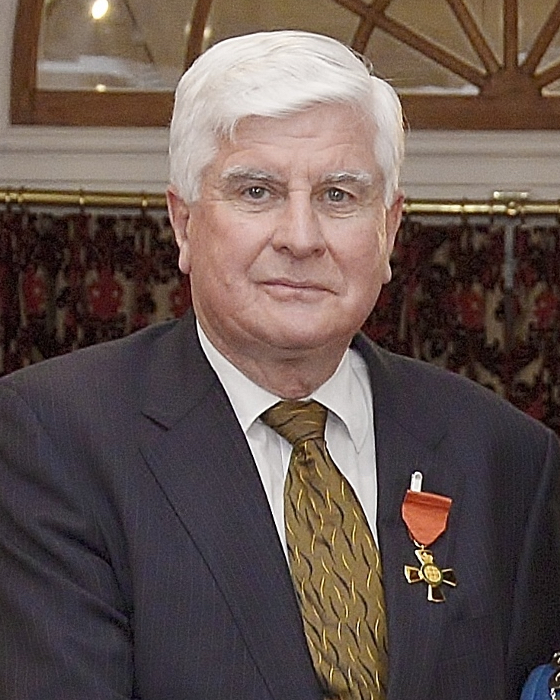
Peter Lorimer

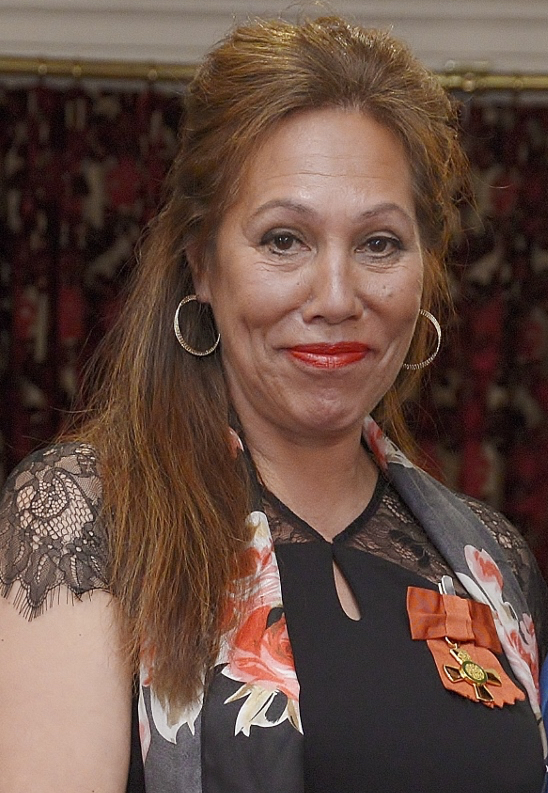
Nina Nawalowalo

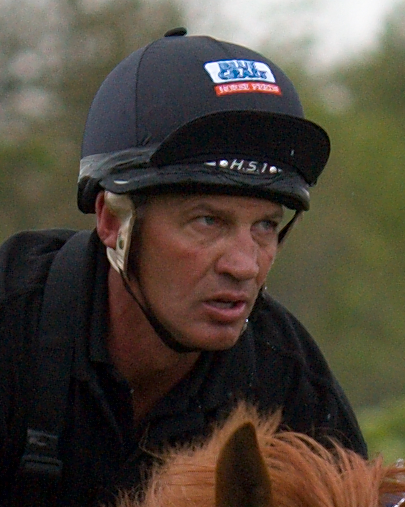
Andrew Nicholson

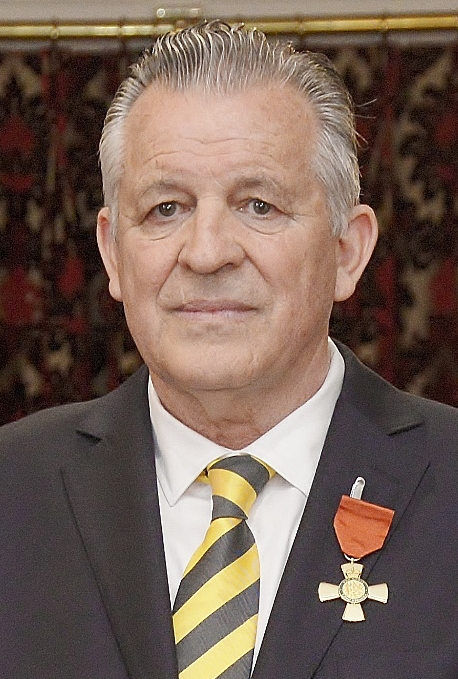
Larry Parr

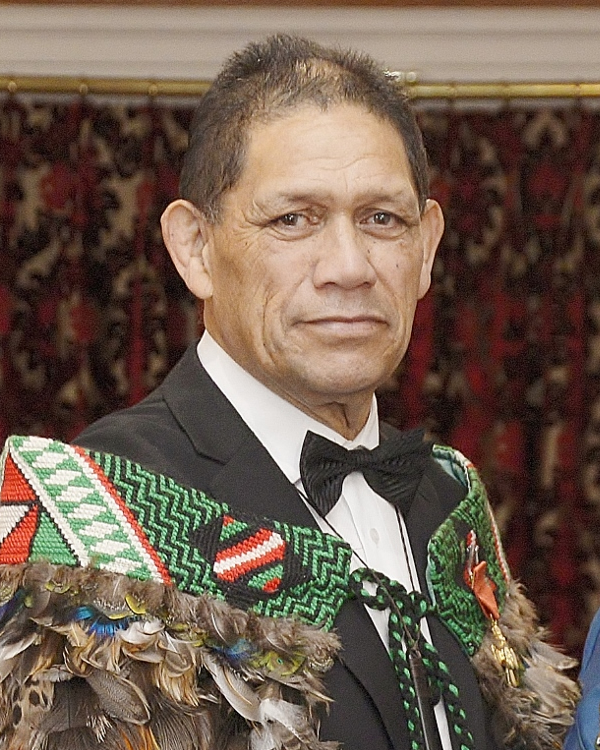
Des Ratima

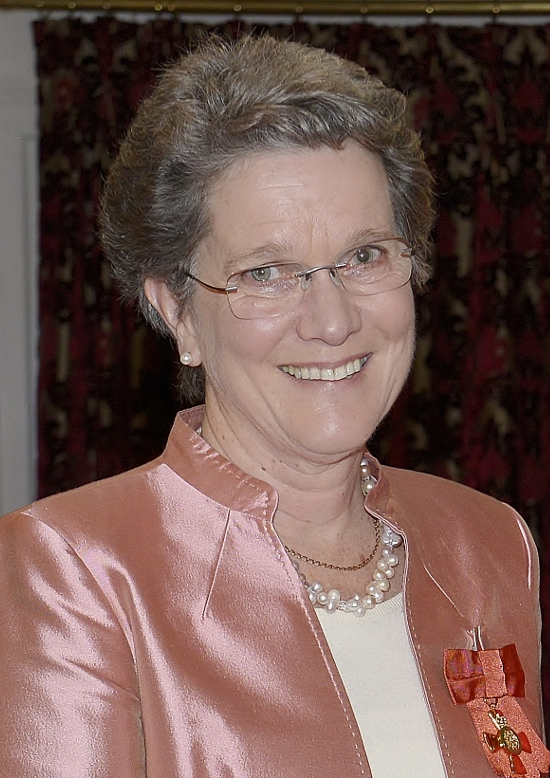
Nicola Shadbolt

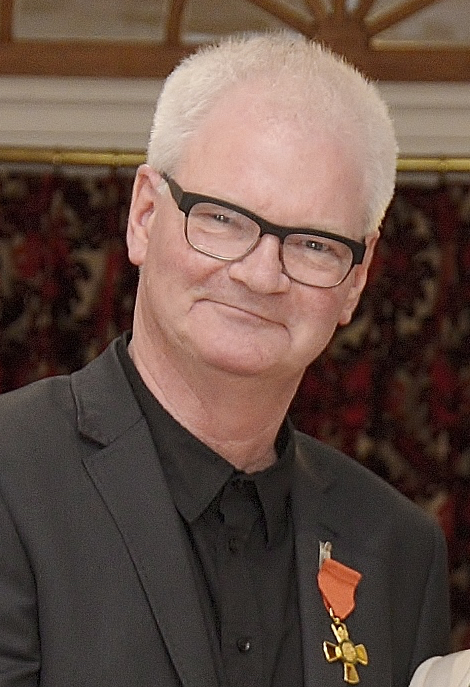
Roger Shepherd

=== Member (MNZM) ===
- Clive Alan Akers – of Palmerston North. For services to rugby and historical research.
- Ian George Begbie – of Ashburton. For services to aviation and motorsport.
- Marian Theresa Burns – of Auckland. For services to music.
- Kristina Cavit – of Auckland. For services to youth and the community.
- Dr Deborah Ann Challinor – of Hamilton. For services to literature and historical research.
- Catherine Anne Chappell – of Auckland. For services to contemporary dance.
- Brian Eric Clarke – of Upper Hutt. For services to the State.
- Jacqueline Emma Clarke – of Auckland. For services to the entertainment industry.
- Squadron Leader Peter Anthony Cochran – of Feilding. For services to the New Zealand Defence Force.
- Associate Professor Bronwen Jane Connor – of Auckland. For services to the treatment of neurological disorders.
- Dianne Eileen Daniels – of Paraparaumu. For services to digital literacy education.
- Dr Judith Anne Davey – of Wellington. For services to seniors.
- Andrew Kerry Dellaca JP – of Christchurch. For services to children and sports governance.
- Associate Professor Janet Lynn Fanslow – of Auckland. For services to the research and prevention of family violence.
- Ainsley Amohaere Gardiner – of Whakatāne. For services to film and television.
- Dr Sharon Ellen Barcello Gemmell JP – of Blenheim. For services to Māori and education.
- Leanne Graham – of Auckland. For services to the software industry.
- Matthew Chadlow Hall – of Ashburton. For services to conservation and fishing.
- Sheran Pauline Hancock – of Feilding. For services to pipe bands.
- Christine Merle Hartstone – of Raglan. For services to equestrian sport.
- Andrea Hewitt – of Christchurch. For services to triathlon.
- Gabrielle Ann Huria – of Christchurch. For services to Māori and governance.
- Margaret Eleanor Jefferies – of Christchurch. For services to the community.
- Dianne Millicent Kenderdine – of Auckland. For services to the community and the cheese industry.
- Hilary Isobel King – of Auckland. For services to special education.
- Ethelwyn Lloyd – of Waikanae. For services to administrative professional development.
- Sarah Jane Longbottom – of Auckland. For services to youth and the arts.
- Laura Tui Mariu – of Auckland. For services to rugby league.
- Rochelle Lisa Martin – of Auckland. For services to rugby and Fire and Emergency New Zealand.
- Dorothy Bell McCarrison – of Auckland. For services to counselling and restorative justice.
- Professor Elisabeth McDonald – of Carterton. For services to the law and education.
- Rebecca Elizabeth Mellish – of Featherston. For services to Māori and governance.
- Helen Ann Murphy – of Christchurch. For services to prisoner welfare and rehabilitation.
- Samara Daisey Nicholas – of Whangārei. For services to marine conservation and education.
- Grant Wallace Nisbett – of Wellington. For services to sports broadcasting.
- Keith Nixon – of Lower Hutt. For services to Fire and Emergency New Zealand.
- William John O'Brien – of Dunedin. For services to victim support and the prevention of domestic violence.
- Christine Rewa Panapa – of Tuakau. For services to sport and Māori.
- Tracy Joy Phillips – of Auckland. For services to the New Zealand Police and the community.
- Isabelle Paulette Nicole Poff-Pencole – of Palmerston North. For services as a translator and interpreter.
- Wendy Preston – of Auckland. For services to performing arts and youth.
- John Gordon Rayner – of Alexandra. For services to kayaking.
- Millan Tame Ruka – of Whangārei. For services to conservation.
- Dr Katherine Julie Saville-Smith – of Marlborough. For services to seniors and housing.
- Anne Elizabeth Scott – of Wellington. For services to quilting.
- Steven Sedley – of Wellington. For services to the Jewish community and music.
- Judy Ann Simpson – of Tauranga. For services to the prevention of domestic violence.
- Deborah Jane Smith – of Auckland. For services to children and art.
- Lesley Stanley – of Tauranga. For services to education and the support of children.
- Brian Henry Stannett – of Te Awamutu. For services to wrestling.
- Darryl Bill Suasua – of Auckland. For services to rugby.
- The Venerable Suthep Surapong – of Wellington. For services to the Cambodian community.
- The Very Reverend Pamela Jean Tankersley – of Palmerston North. For services to the Presbyterian Church and the community.
- Janette Maisie Tasker JP – of Auckland. For services to the community and education.
- Senior Constable Phillip Richard Taylor – of Rotorua. For services to the New Zealand Police and the community.
- Alison Mary Timms – of Cromwell. For services to local government and the environment.
- Royce Gary Walls – of Whitianga. For services to the horse racing industry.
- Jonathan Donald Wilkinson – of Whangārei. For services to people with disabilities.
- Mary Anne Wright – of Horseshoe Bay, Texas, United States of America. For services to gymnastics.
- Julie Christine Wylie – of Christchurch. For services to musical play therapy.
- Yikun Zhang – of Auckland. For services to New Zealand–China relations and the Chinese community.

Honorary

- Kumiko Imai Duxfield – of Auckland. For services to the Japanese community.
- Saimoni Lealea – of Wellington. For services to Pacific communities.
- Reverend Setaita Tokilupe Veikune – of Auckland. For services to the Pacific community.
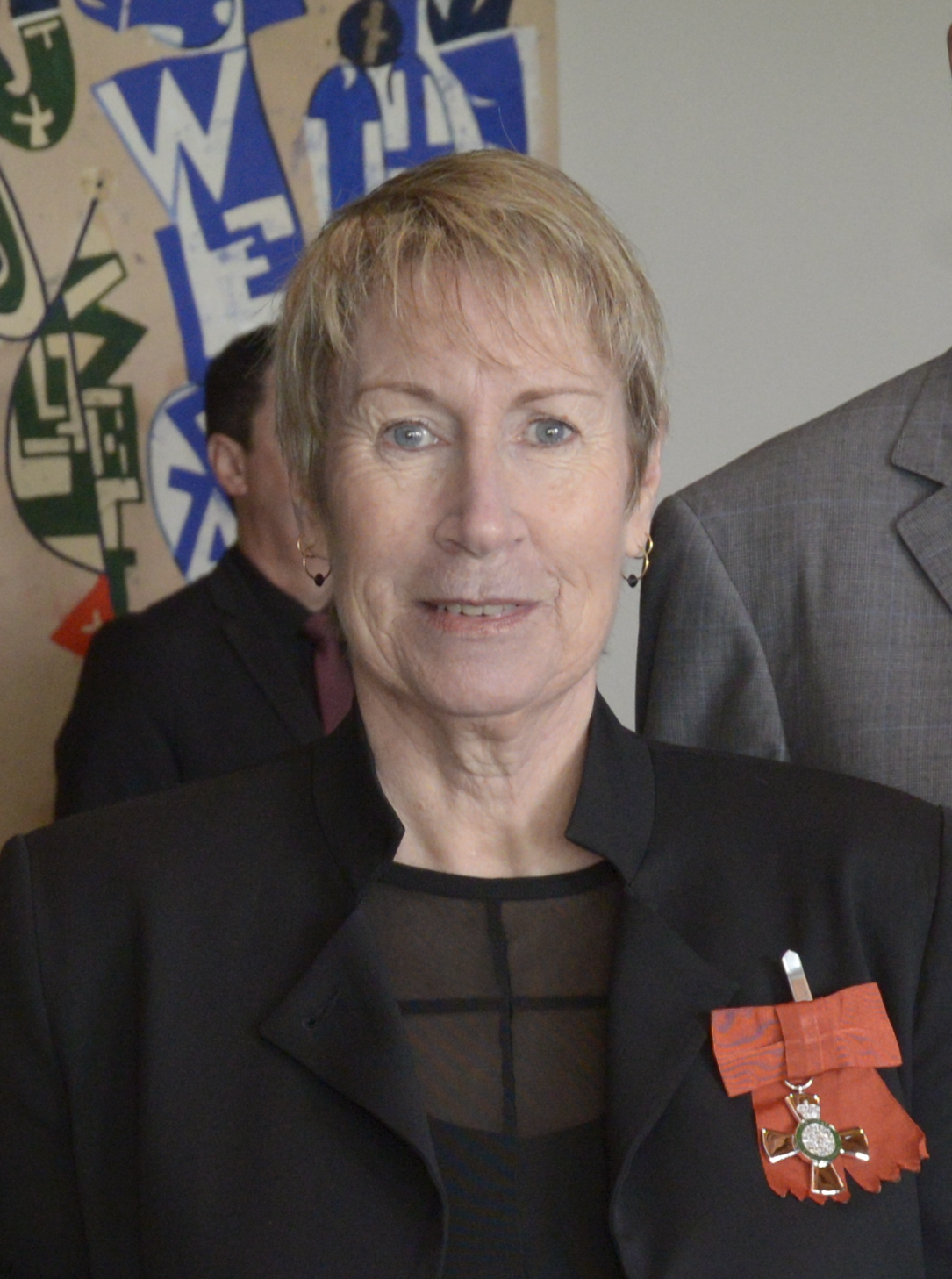
Deborah Challinor

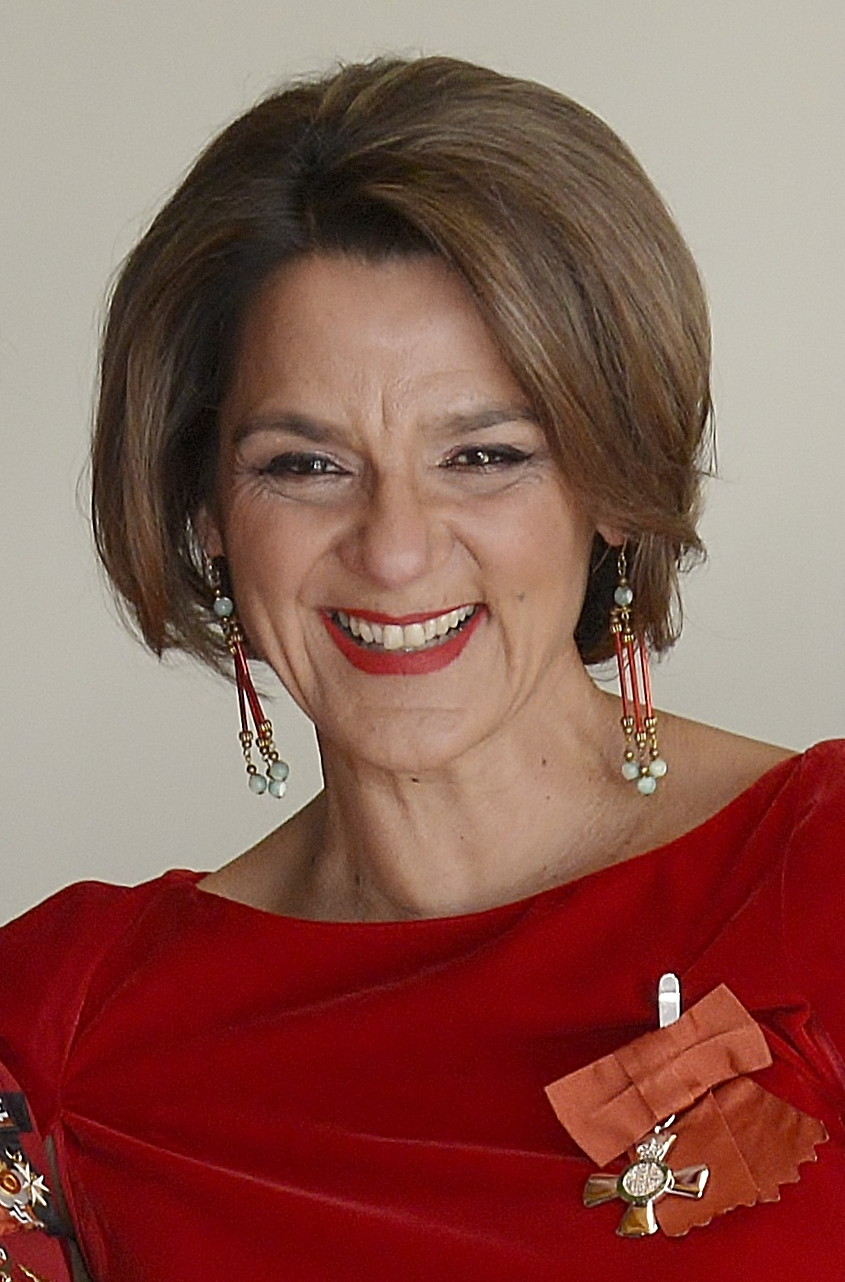
Jackie Clarke

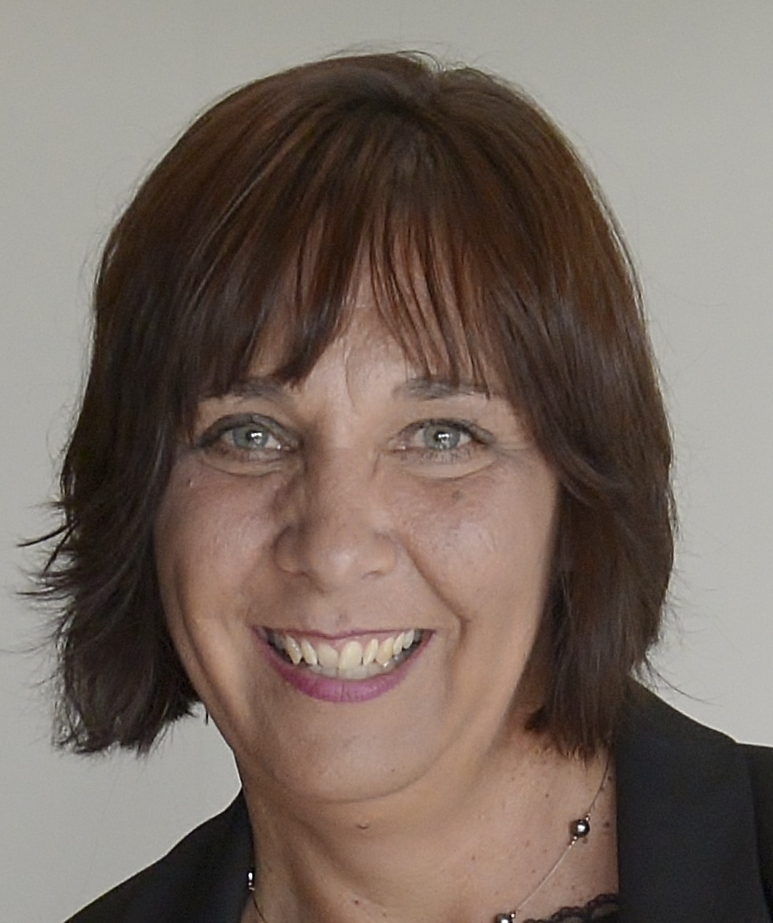
Bronwen Connor

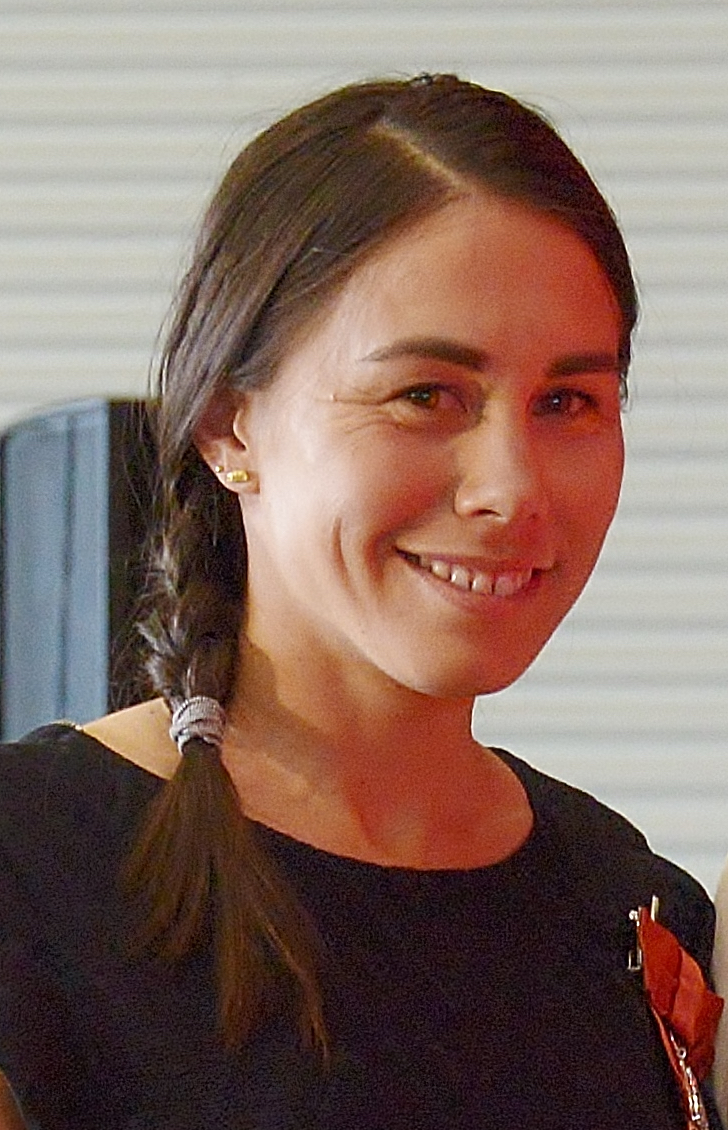
Andrea Hewitt

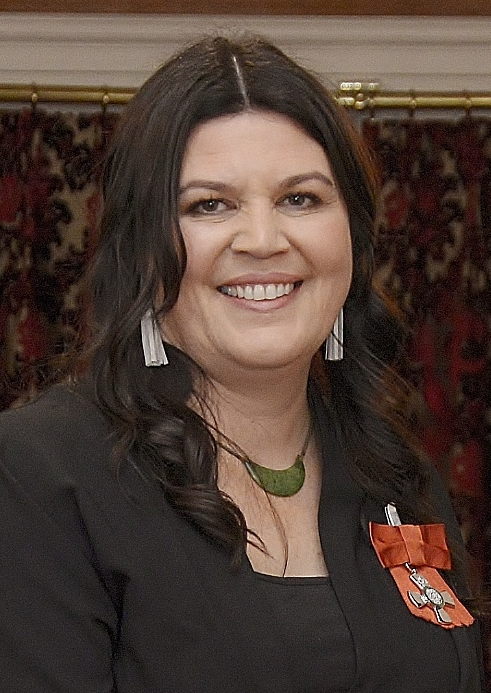
Ainsley Gardiner

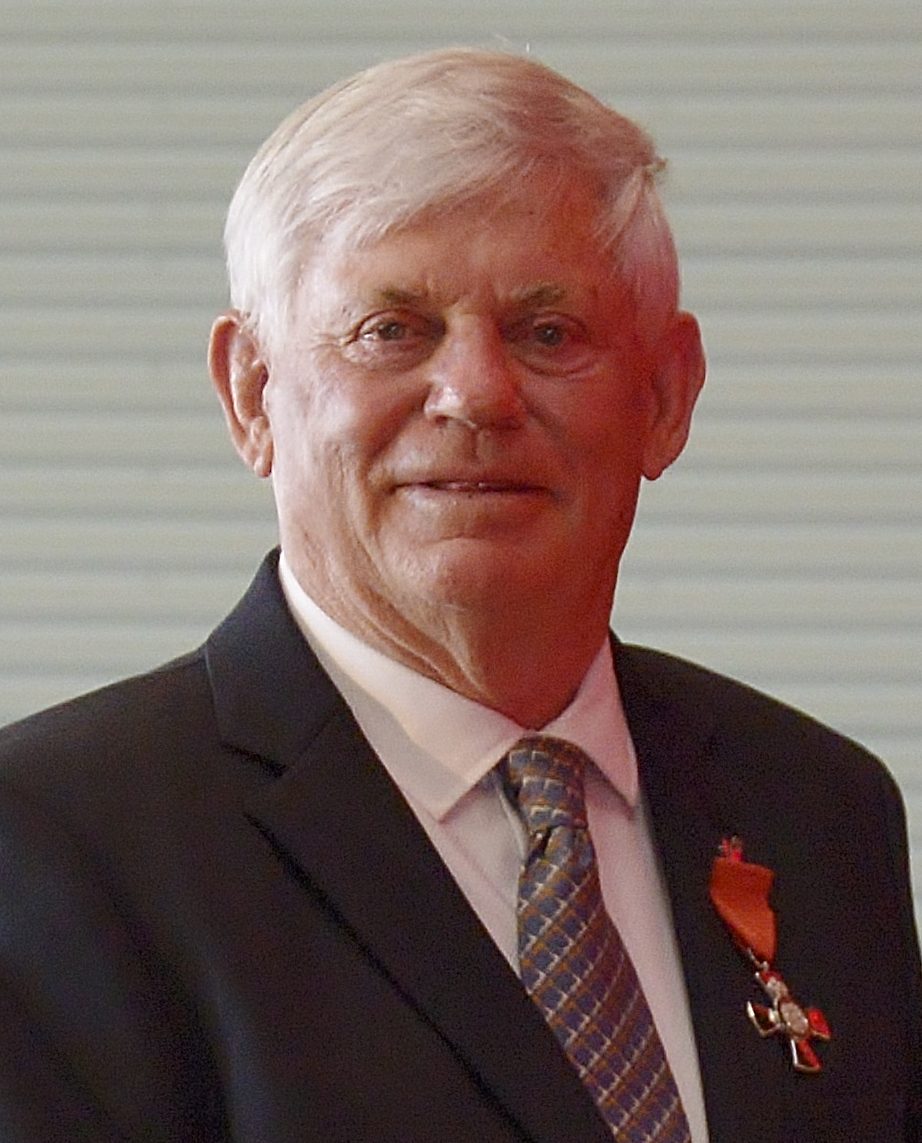
Matthew Hall

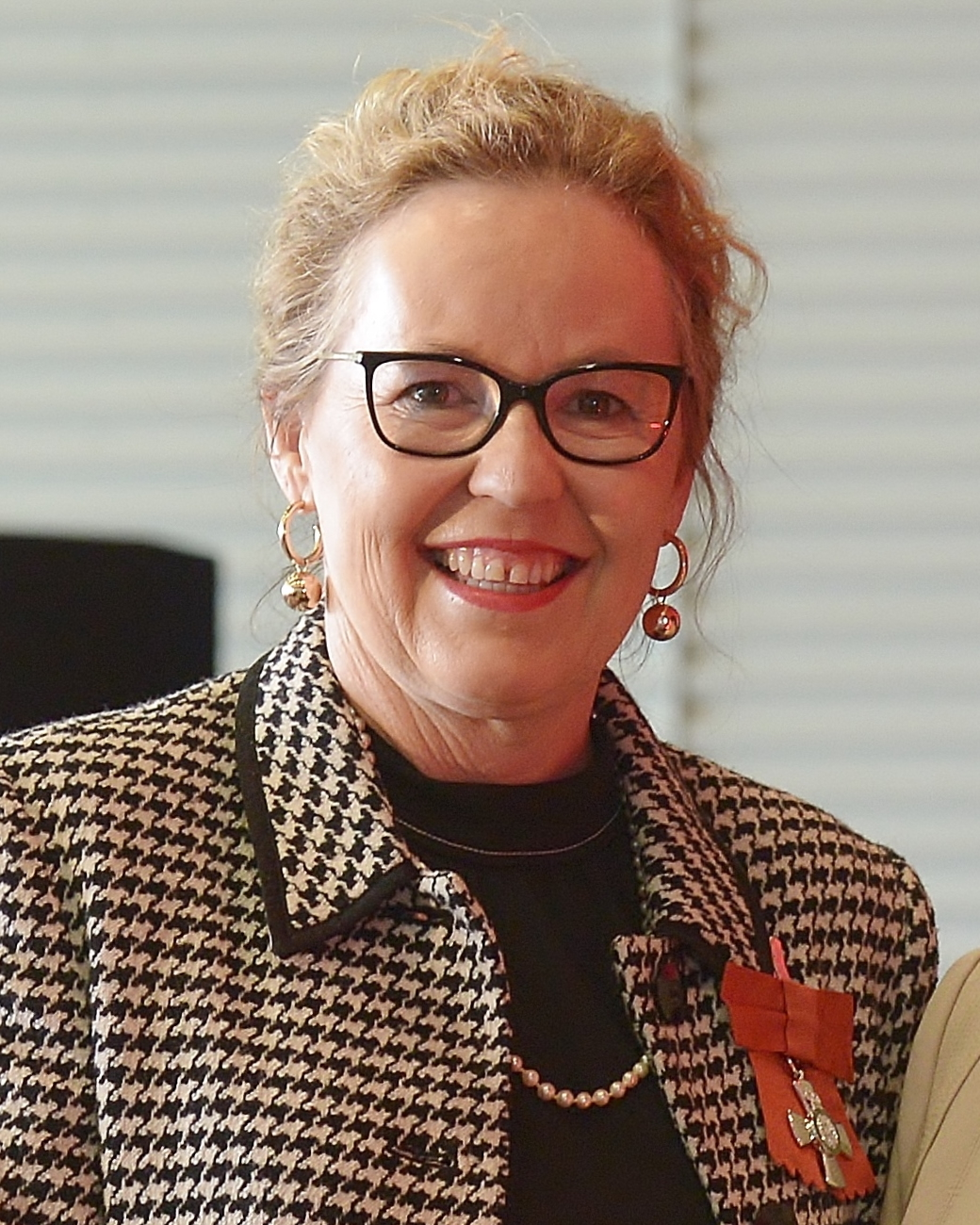
Gabrielle Huria

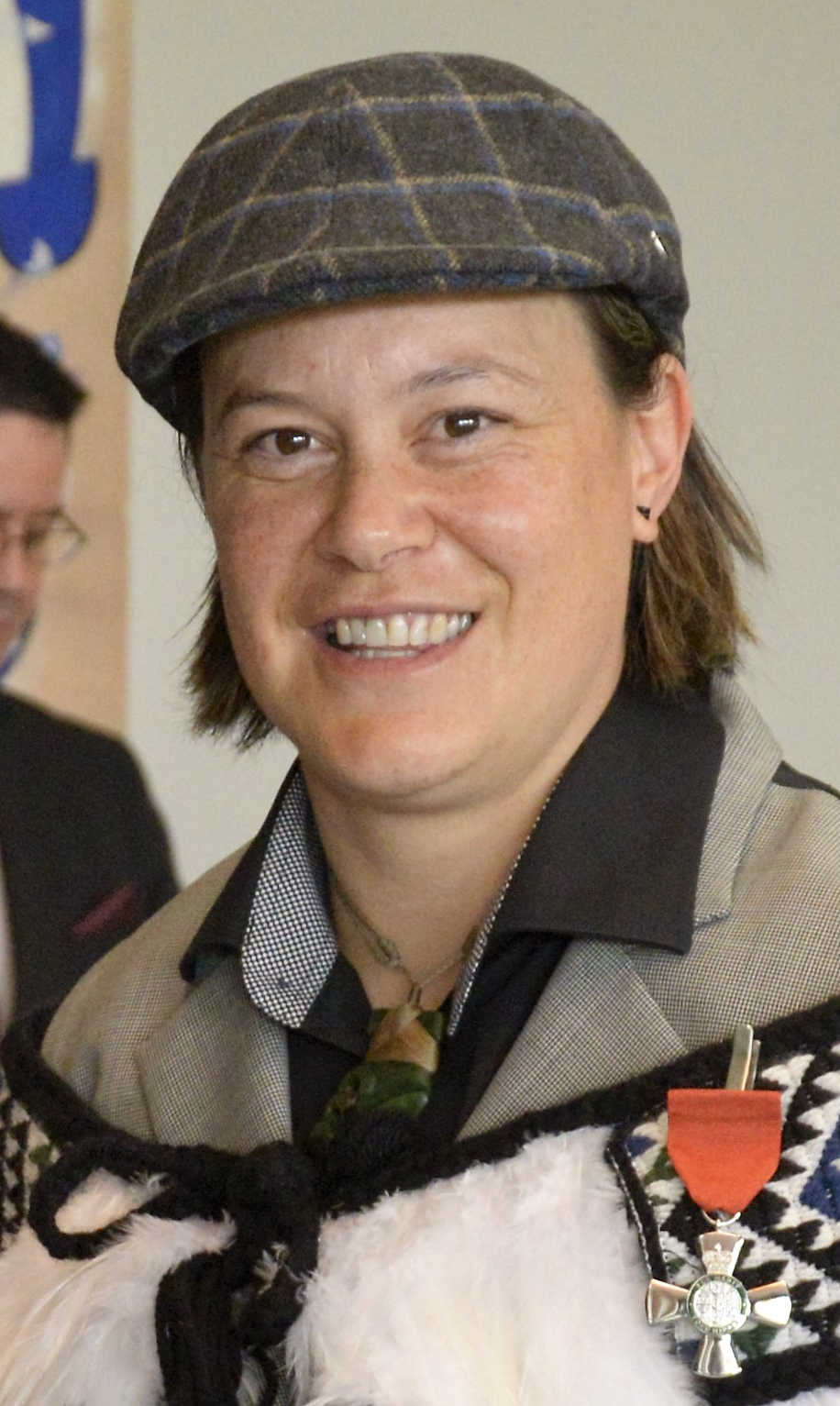
Laura Mariu

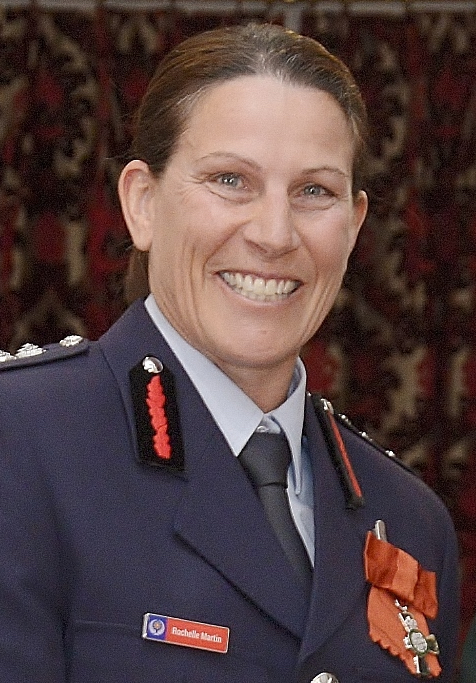
Rochelle Martin

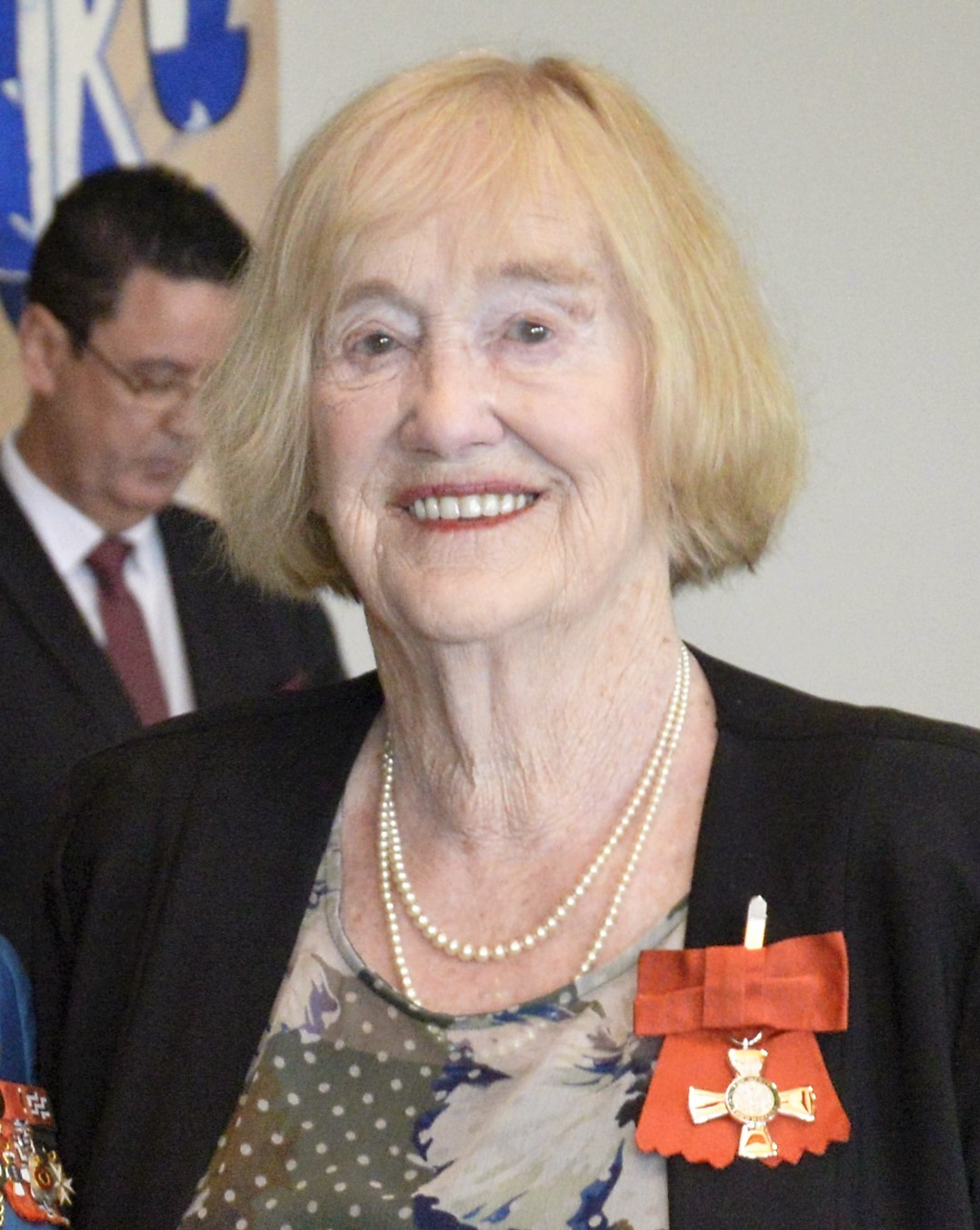
Dorothy McCarrison

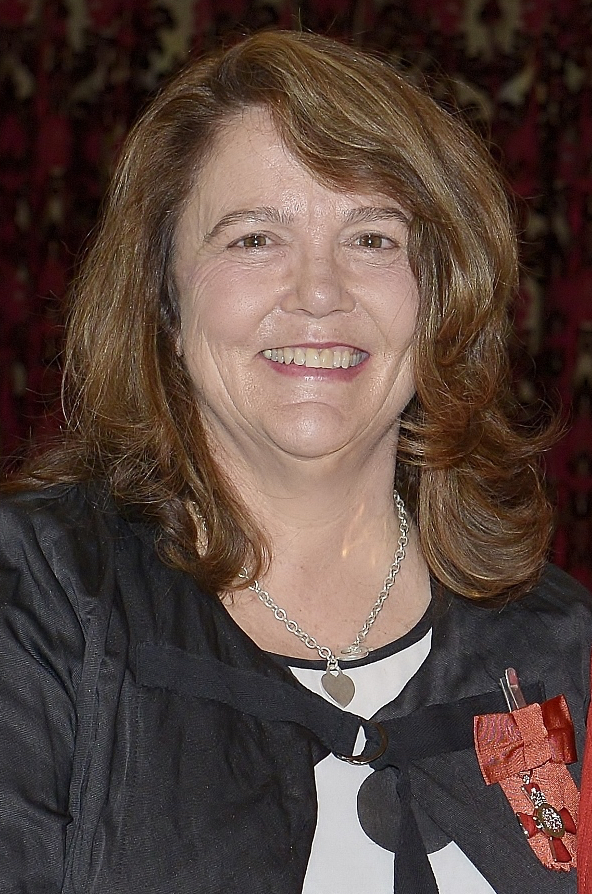
Elisabeth McDonald

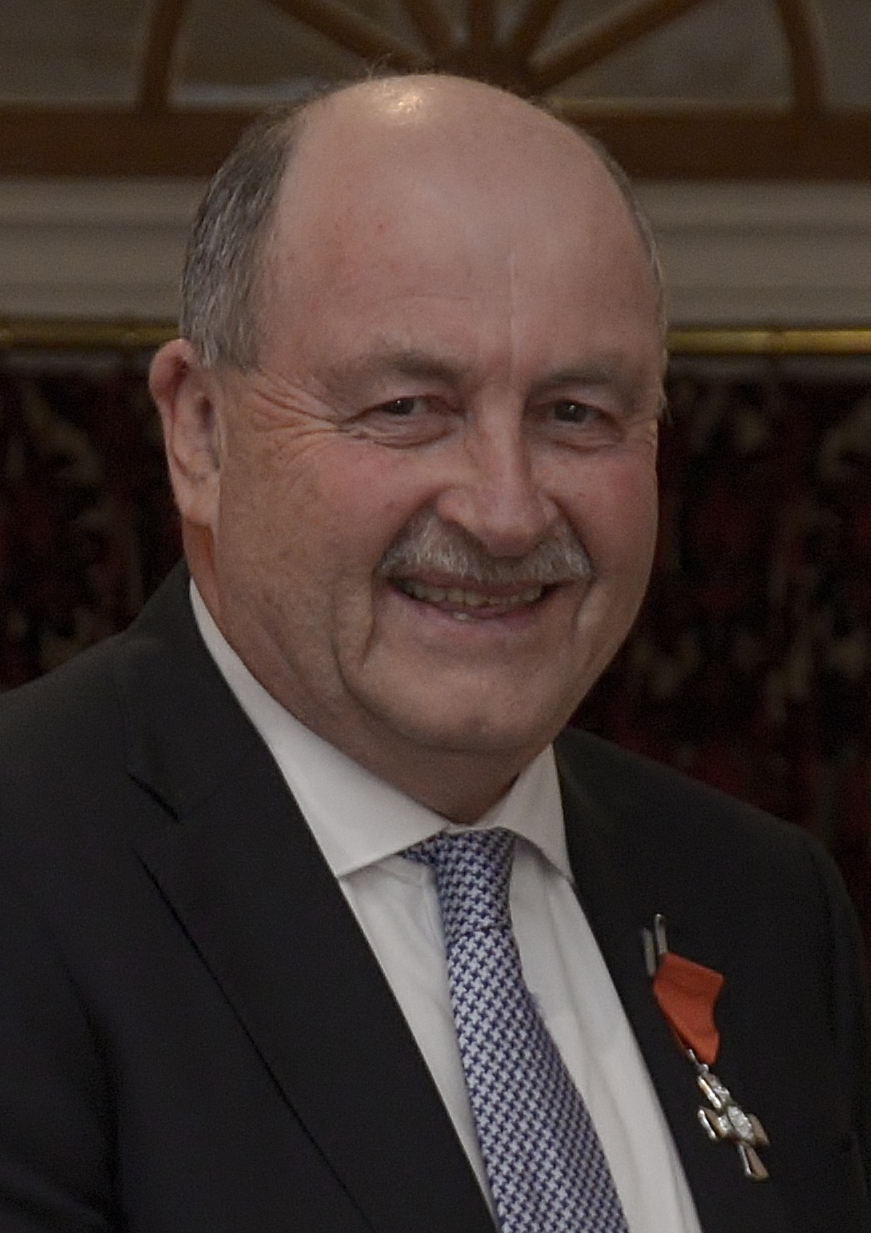
Grant Nisbett

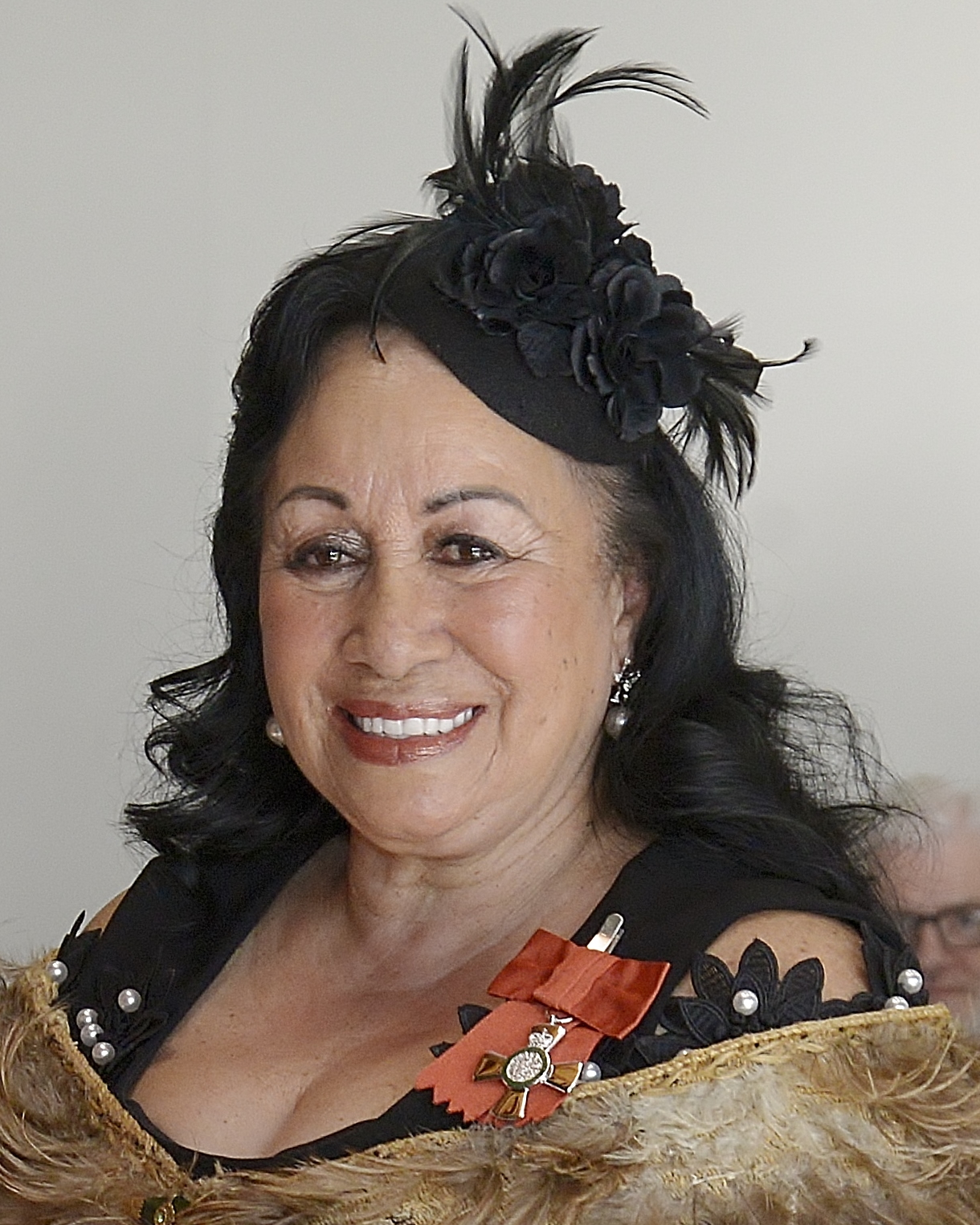
Christine Panapa

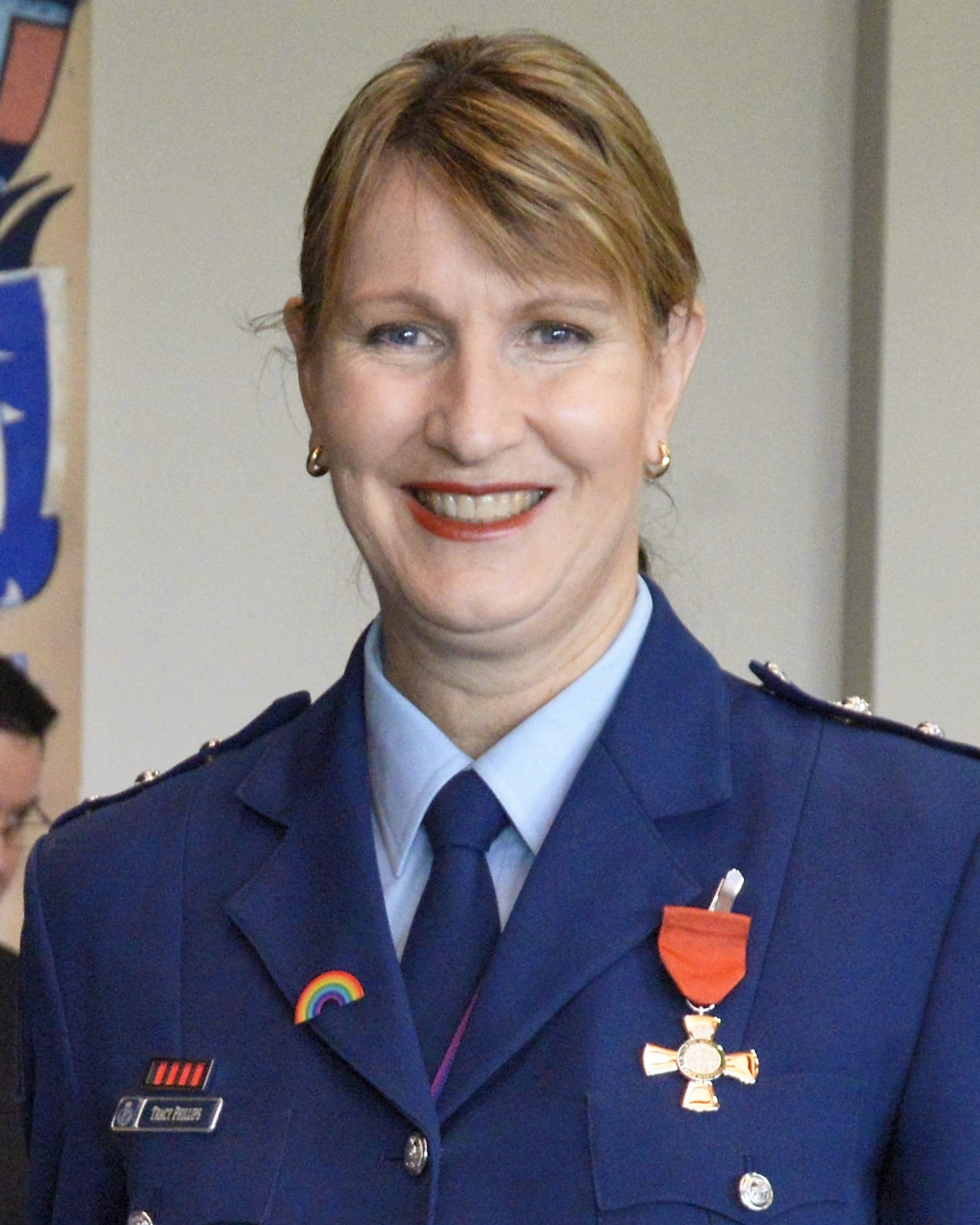
Tracy Phillips

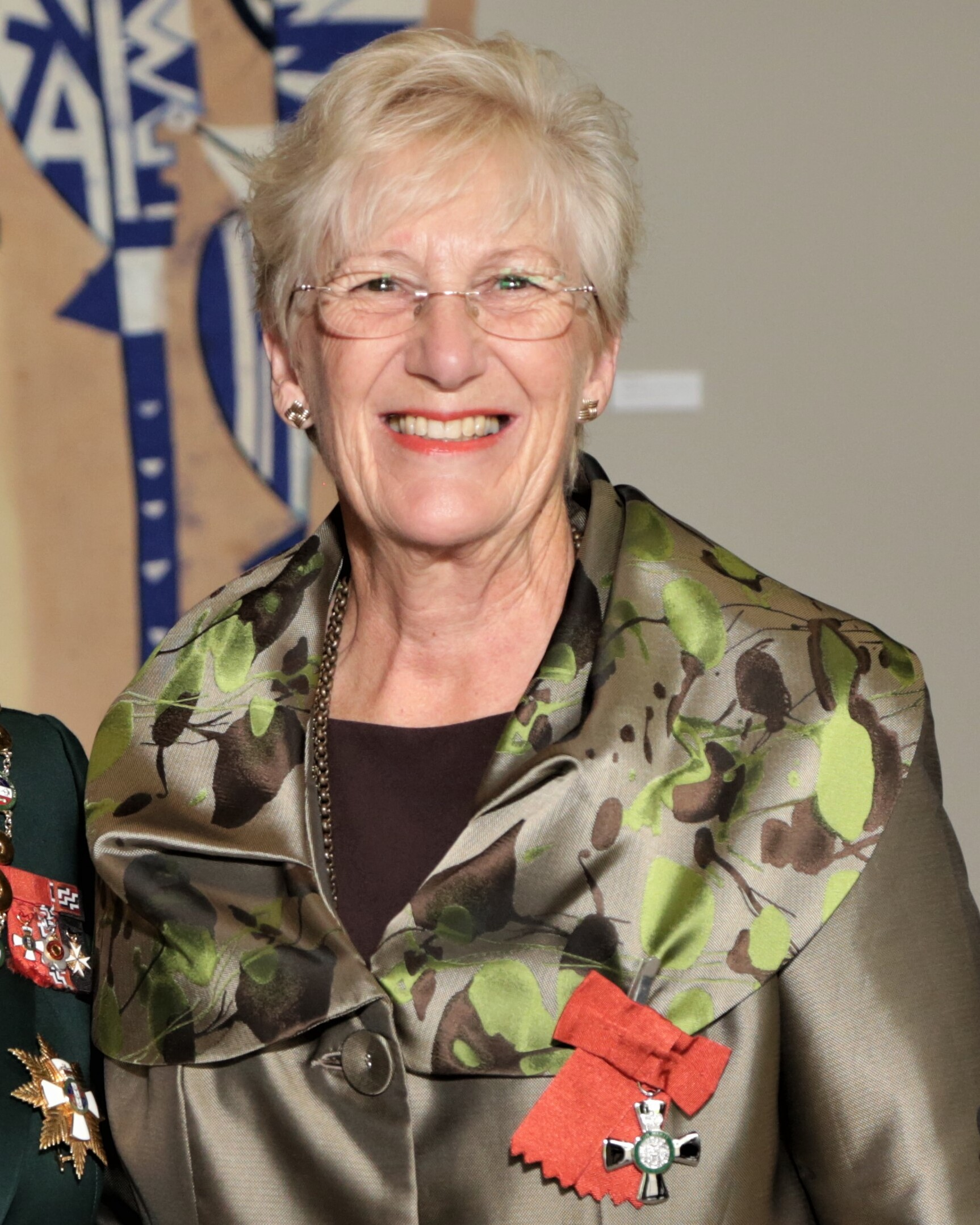
Lesley Stanley

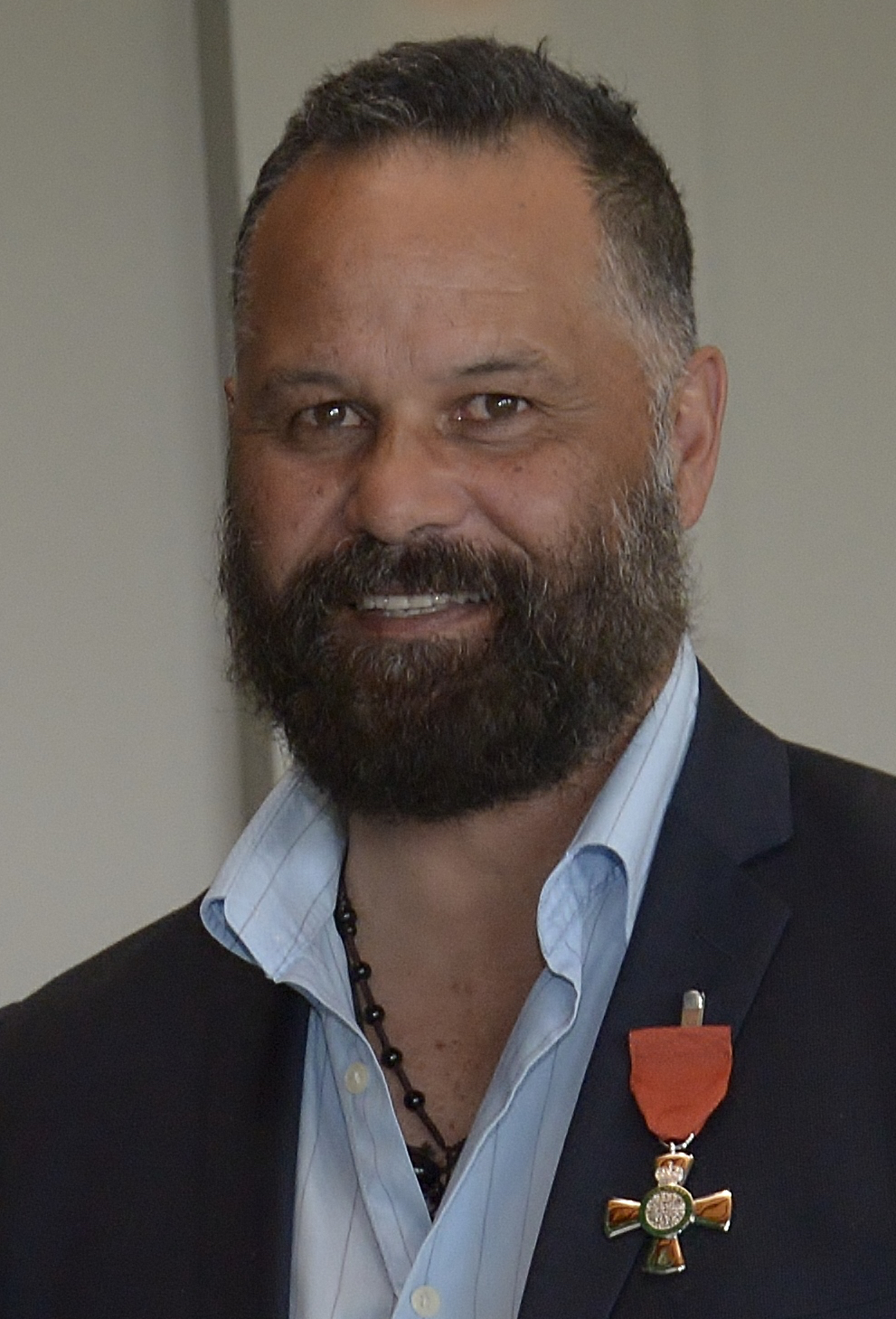
Darryl Suasua

== Companion of the Queen's Service Order (QSO) ==
- Leith Pirika Comer – of Rotorua. For services to Māori, the State and local government.
- Dr Paul Hugh Stewart Reynolds – of Gisborne. For services to the State.
- Dr Martin David Sage – of Christchurch. For services to forensic pathology.
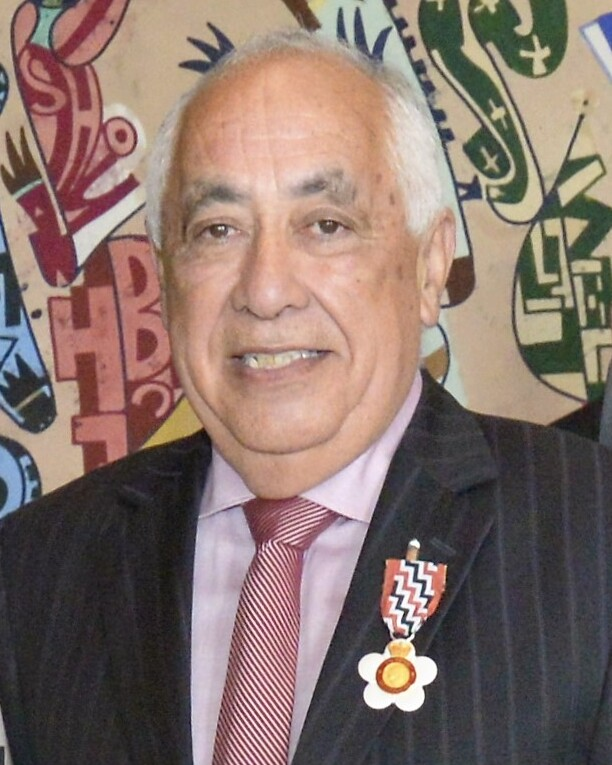
Leith Comer

== Queen's Service Medal (QSM) ==
- Martine Abel-Williamson – of Auckland. For services to people with disabilities.
- Heather Christine Aitken – of Reefton. For services to karate.
- Russell Kingsley Anderson – of Alexandra. For services to Fire and Emergency New Zealand.
- Ruth Margaret Arnison – of Dunedin. For services to poetry and literature.
- Annie May Ballantine – of Auckland. For services to the community.
- Dr Mary Jean Ballantyne – of Te Awamutu. For services to women's and children's health.
- Leslie Stephen Box – of Dunedin. For services to the community.
- Alison Jean Brearley – of Auckland. For services to sport and education.
- Stewart Bull – of Invercargill. For services to conservation and Māori.
- Dorothy Nola Burgess – of Gisborne. For services to people with disabilities, particularly the blind.
- Virginia Chong JP – of Auckland. For services to the Chinese community.
- Raymond Kopuraehana Coffin – of Te Kūiti. For services to the Māori Wardens Association.
- Howard Daniel Cole – of Pōkeno. For services to Fire and Emergency New Zealand.
- Linda Dorothy Conning – of Ōhope. For services to conservation.
- Jocelyn Cooney – of Cambridge. For services to the community.
- Roger Griffith Cox – of Hamilton. For services to science education.
- Peter Robert Crawford – of Whangārei. For services to the community and sport.
- Irene Eva Hiriwa Curnow – of Tauranga. For services to Māori and education.
- Paul Frederic Gordon Dewsbery – of Timaru. For services to the community.
- Kenneth Laurie Donald – of New Plymouth. For services to marine search and rescue and the community.
- James Henderson Drummond – of Wellington. For services to swimming.
- Merle Fausett – of Tauranga. For services to music.
- Peter Charles Goodman – of Nelson. For services to the community.
- Helen Margaret Guthrie – of Waikanae. For services to music and horticulture.
- John Christopher Jackets – of Kerikeri. For services to music.
- Linden May Johnson – of Auckland. For services to the community.
- Richard Joseph – of Dunedin. For services to the Lebanese community.
- Tafafuna'i Fa'atasi Lauese JP – of Auckland. For services to the Pacific community.
- Reverend Perema Leasi – of Porirua. For services to the Pacific community.
- Avis Annabel Leeson – of Hamilton. For services to horticultural education.
- Carole Frances Long – of Tauranga. For services to conservation.
- Hughina May Mackey – of Auckland. For services to prisoners' support.
- Mary Joan Mackintosh – of Kaiapoi. For services to the community.
- Maera Maki-Anderson – of Murupara. For services to Fire and Emergency New Zealand.
- Donald Manning – of Lower Hutt. For services to sailing and people with disabilities.
- Hatete Joe Manukau JP – of Katikati. For services to Fire and Emergency New Zealand and the community.
- Errol Walter Martyn – of Christchurch. For services to aviation history.
- Glen Rohan McDonald – of Wellington. For services to art and the community.
- Dr John Francis McGettigan – of Methven. For services to rural health.
- Ruth Victoria McNamara – of Alexandra. For services to the community.
- Raymond Henry Mettrick – of Havelock North. For services to cricket.
- Susan Millar – of Upper Hutt. For services to conservation.
- Penelope May Molnar – of Nelson. For services to the community.
- Ronald Frederick Nind – of Queenstown. For services to the community.
- Elizabeth Anne Noffke – of Auckland. For services to music.
- Dr Grant Leslie Norbury – of Alexandra. For services to conservation.
- Marjorie Frances Orchiston – of Wellington. For services to music therapy and as a pianist.
- Dr Carolyn Rae Peters – of Whangārei. For services to the community.
- Geraldine Pomeroy – of Hamilton. For services to people with disabilities.
- Alison Avison Ross – of Christchurch. For services to conservation.
- Paul Francis Sangster – of Tākaka. For services to local government and the community.
- Rosemarie Searle – of Kumara. For services to the community and sport.
- Richard Henry Shepherd JP – of Whangārei. For services to Māori and the community.
- Allan Sheppard – of Upper Hutt. For services to conservation.
- Glennis Sheppard – of Upper Hutt. For services to conservation.
- Mavis Lata Singh – of Auckland. For services to migrants and the community.
- Reverend Lucky Richard Slade JP – of Auckland. For services to the Samoan community.
- Margaret Jean Slade – of Ōpōtiki. For services to conservation.
- Stuart Victor Slade – of Ōpōtiki. For services to conservation.
- Barbara Ann Timms – of Levin. For services to the community.
- Thanh Tran – of Auckland. For services to philanthropy and Asian communities.
- Catherine Tulloch – of Whangārei. For services to seniors and people with disabilities.
- Robert Tulloch – of Whangārei. For services to seniors and people with disabilities.
- Elaine Olive Dawn Utting JP – of Auckland. For services to the community and netball.
- Beverley Doreen Van – of Christchurch. For services to bonsai.
- Margaret Lyn Wade – of Auckland. For services to conservation.
- Jane Mary Williams – of Auckland. For services to the arts and education.
- Warwick Sutherland Wilson – of Auckland. For services to conservation.

Honorary

- Bingyu Chen – of Auckland. For services to Chinese culture and arts.
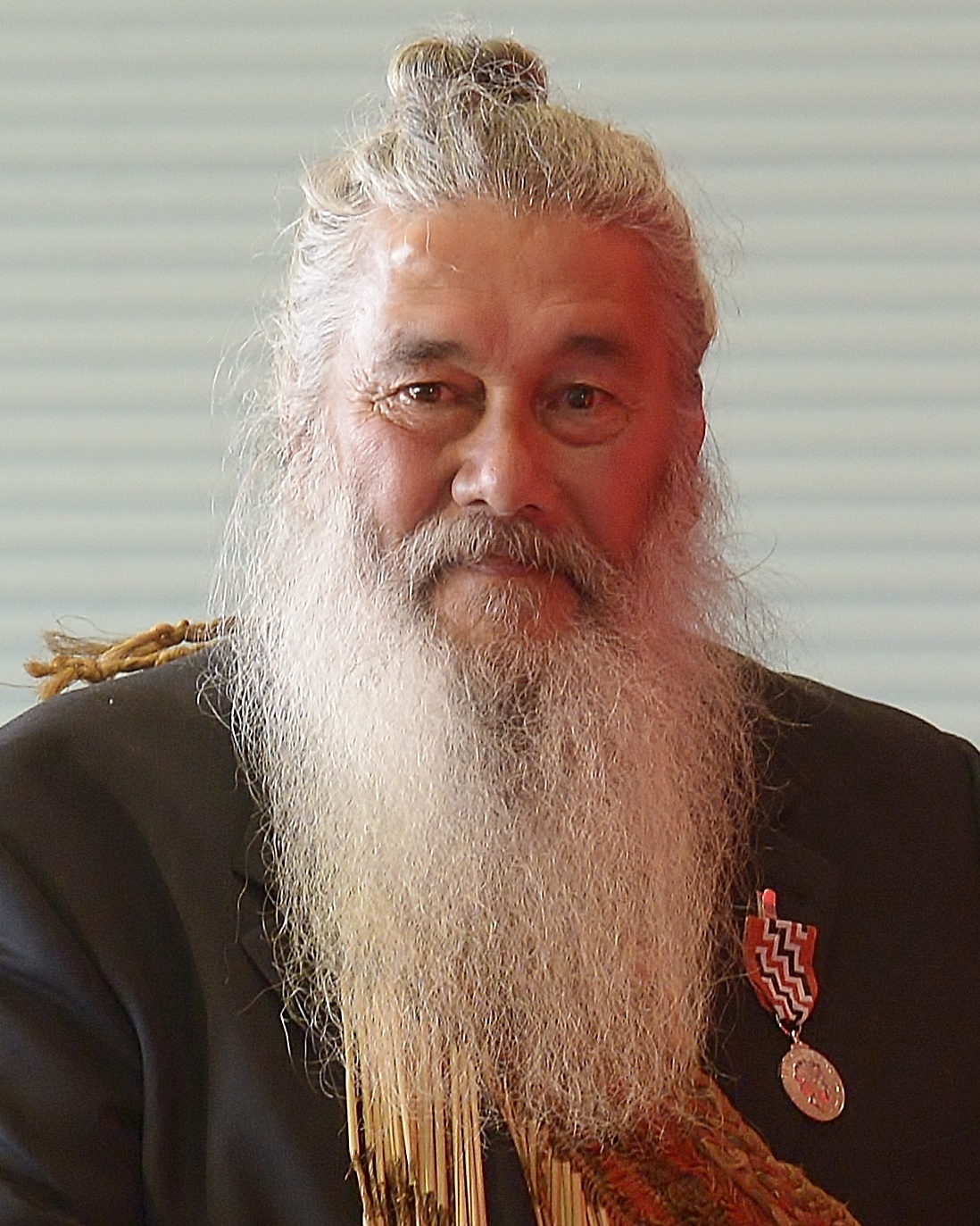
Stewart Bull

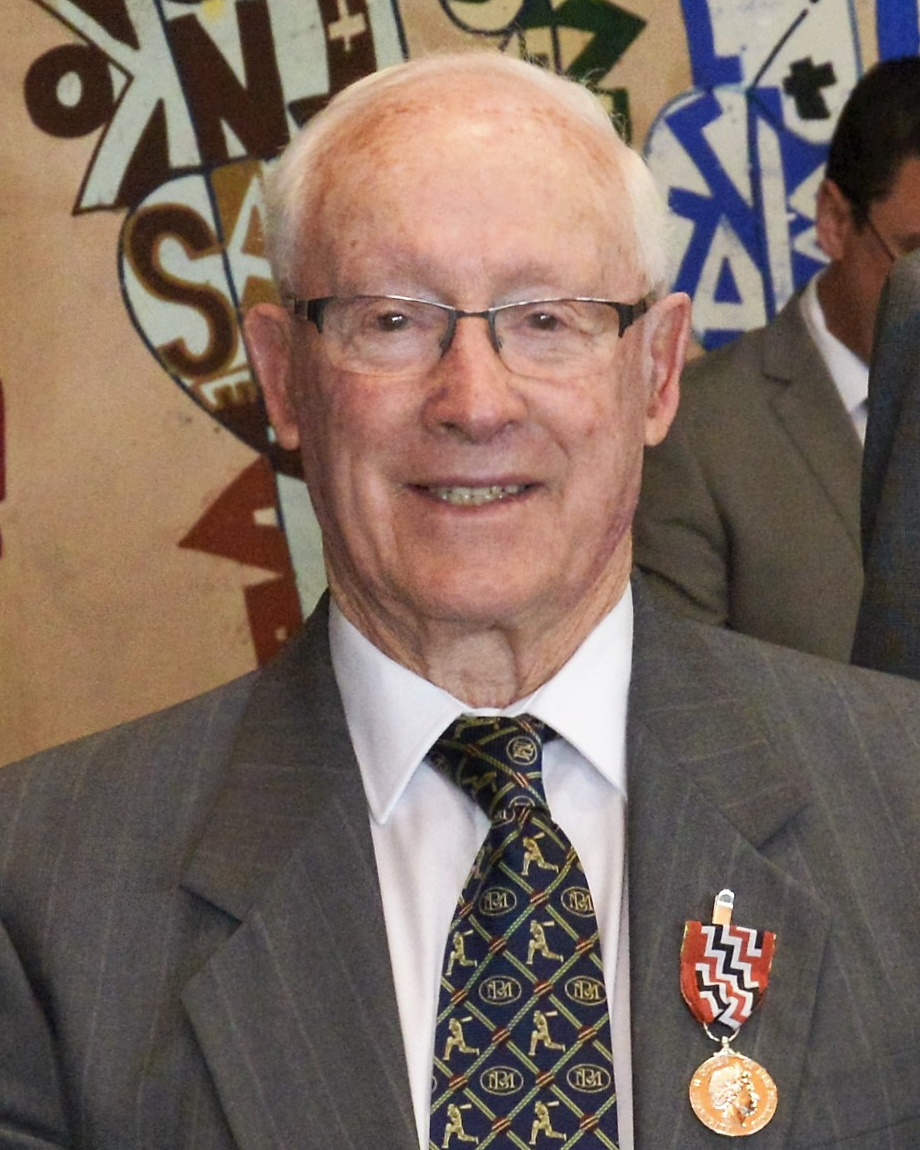
Peter Crawford

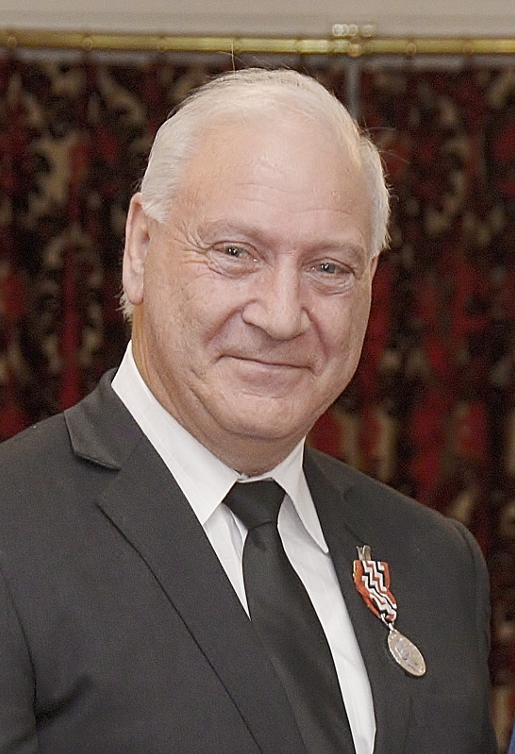
Paul Sangster

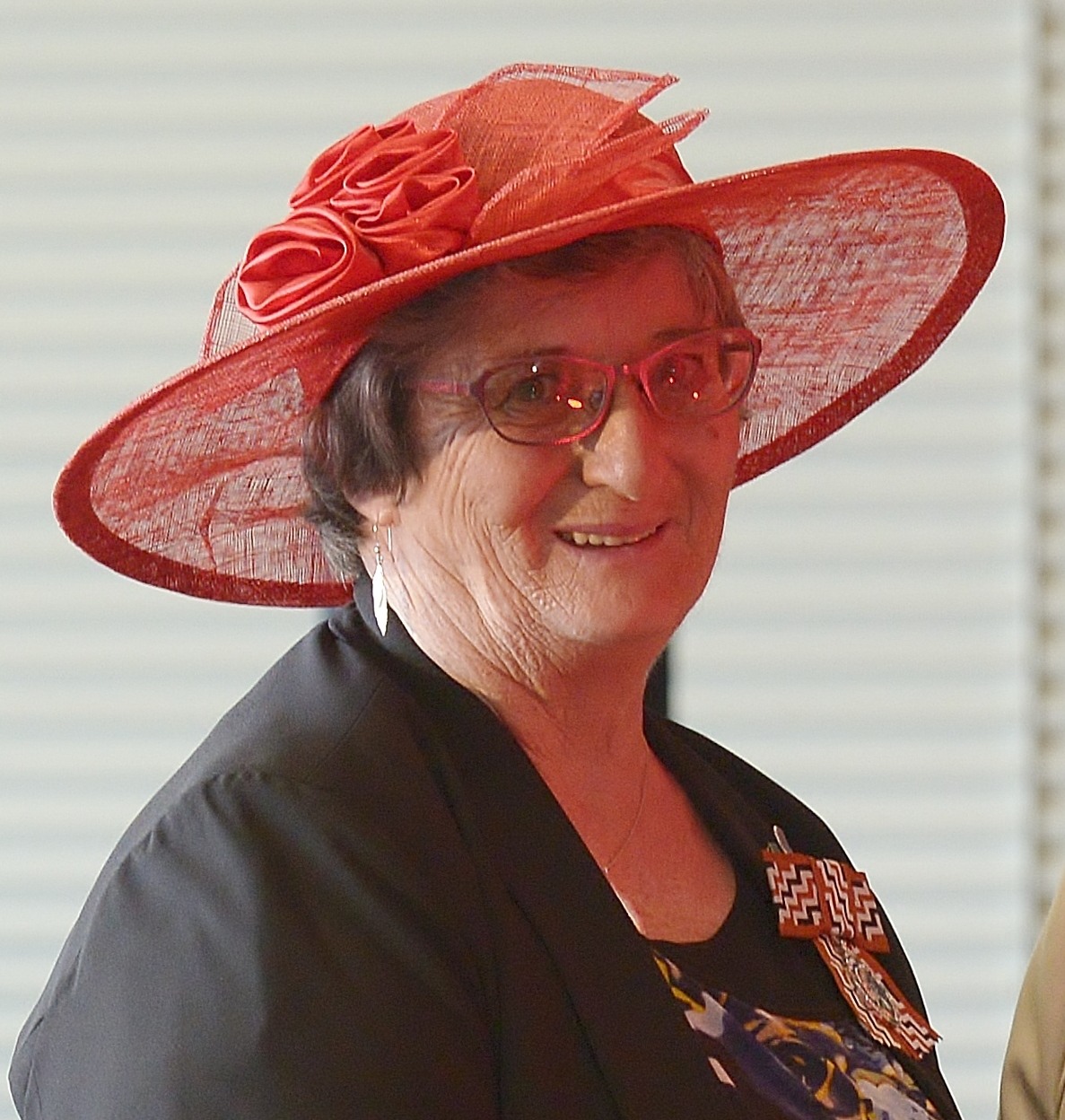
Rosemarie Searle

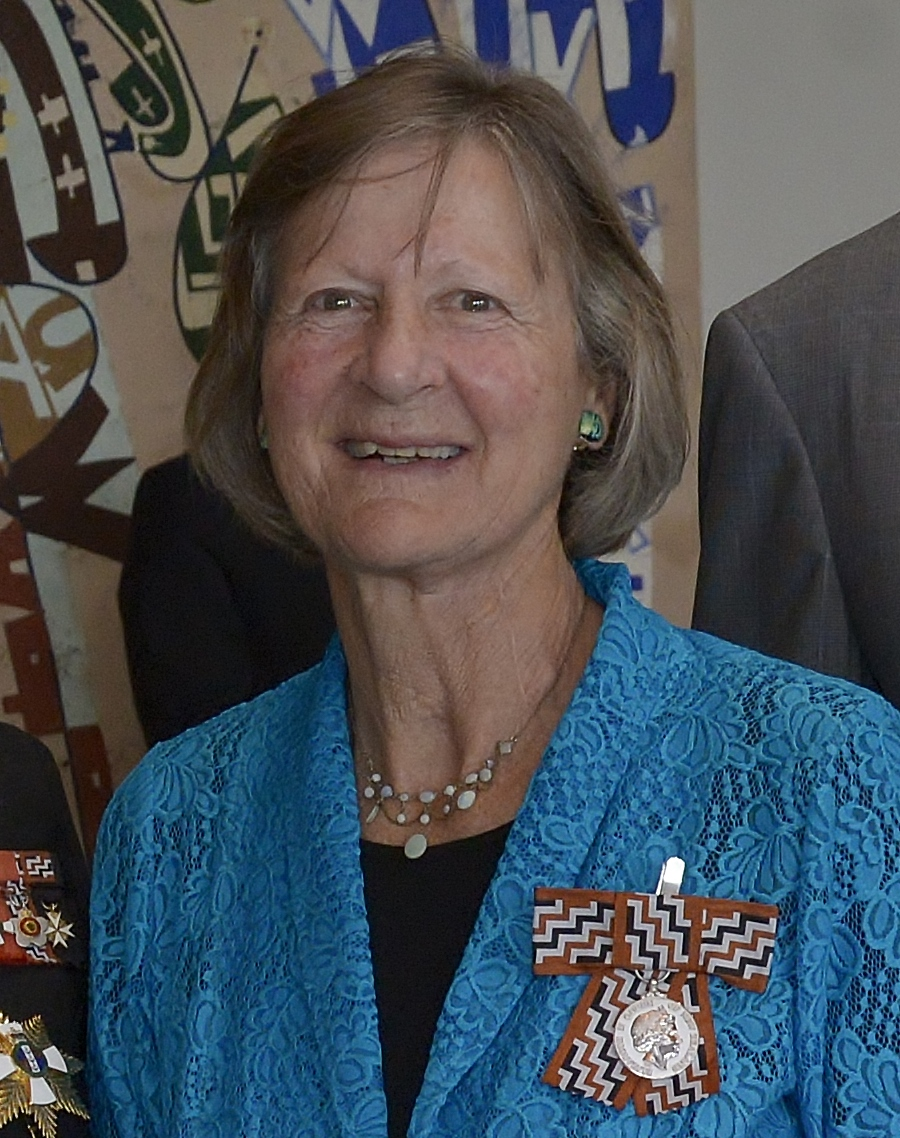
Lyn Wade

== New Zealand Distinguished Service Decoration (DSD) ==
- Captain Gabrielle Louise Gofton – of Palmerston North. For services to the New Zealand Defence Force.

== New Zealand Bravery Decoration (NZBD) ==
- Michael Scott Riley – of Upper Hutt. For an act of exceptional bravery in a situation of danger on 8 September 2015.

== New Zealand Bravery Medal (NZBM) ==
- Police Officer S. For an act of bravery on 8 September 2015.
