= Ageing Well =

Collaborative public health research programme in New Zealand (2015–2024)

- Ageing Well National Science Challenge
- Established: 2015
- Type: Research programme
- Location: New Zealand
- Director: David Baxter
- Budget: $34.9 m NZD
- Funding: MBIE
- Website: www.ageingwellchallenge.co.nz

Ageing Well (Māori: Kia eke kairangi ki te taikaumātuatanga) was one of New Zealand's eleven collaborative research programmes known as National Science Challenges. Running from 2015 to 2024, the focus of Ageing Well National Science Challenge (AWNSC) research was sustaining health and wellbeing towards the end of life, particularly in Māori and Pacific populations in New Zealand.

== Establishment and governance ==
The New Zealand Government agreed in August 2012 to fund National Science Challenges: large multi-year collaborative research programmes that would address important issues in New Zealand's future. The funding criteria were set out in January 2014, with proposals assessed by a Science Board within the Ministry of Business, Innovation, and Employment (MBIE).

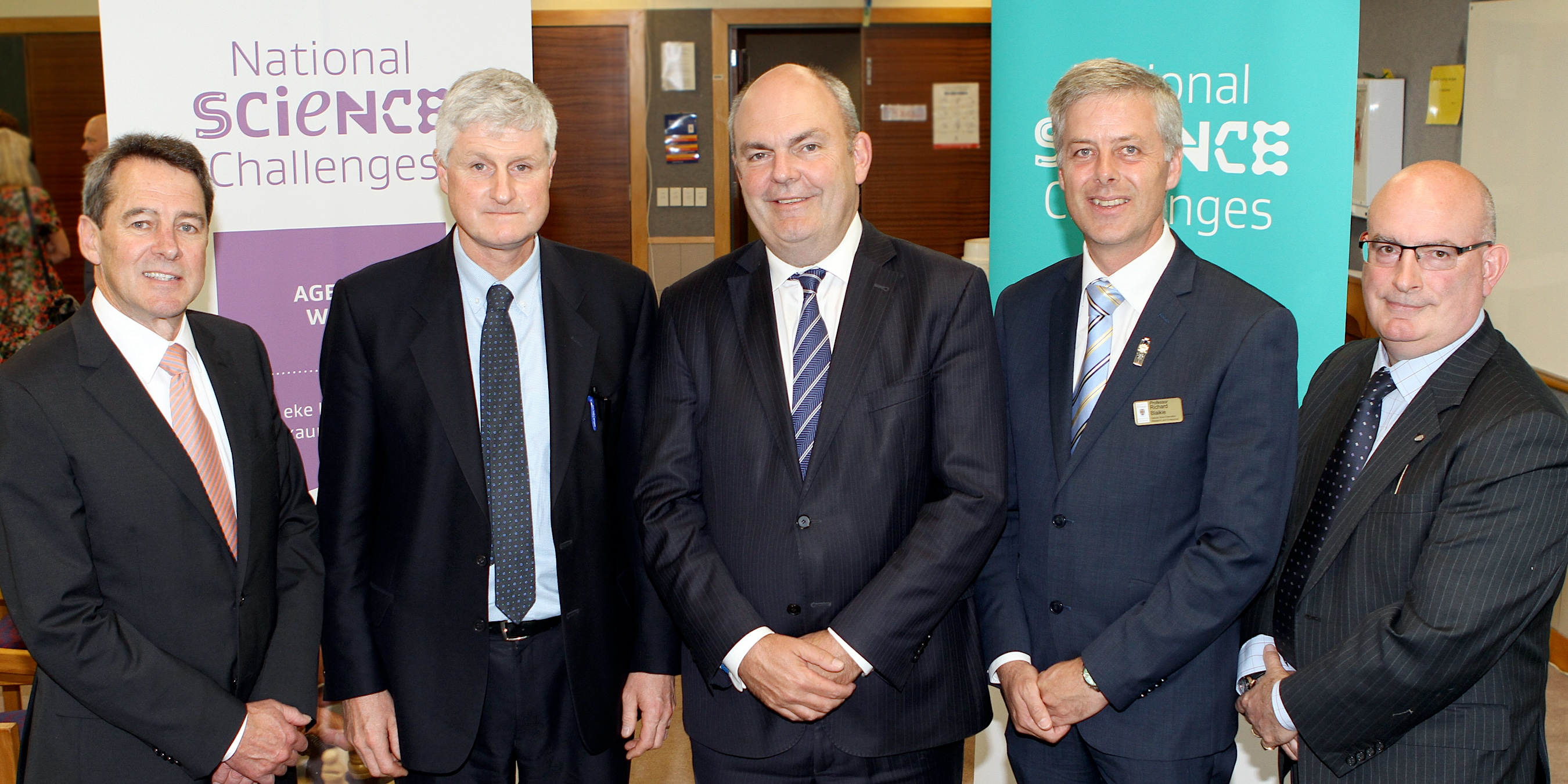
Official launch of Ageing Well in 2015; Science and Innovation Minister Steven Joyce centre, David Baxter far right

After a planning phase in 2014, MBIE approved the University of Otago was approved as a host for the project. AWNSC was launched on 4 March 2015 by Minister for Science and Innovation Steven Joyce, one of three health-based National Science Challenges. The Māori name of Ageing Well was Kia eke (to strive for) kairangi (something esteemed) ki te taikaumātuatanga (of being elderly).

Ageing Well's governance and science leadership teams as well as a Kāhui Rōpū (Māori advisory group) and international science advisory panel were all established in 2016. Di McCarthy was appointed chair of the science challenge, a position she held until 2020.

David Baxter was appointed initial director of AWNSC. Deputy Director Debra Waters became director of AWNSC in 2019, and left in 2020. Louise Parr-Brownlie, who joined Ageing Well as deputy director in 2018, became director in 2020, with David Baxter as co-director. After Parr-Brownlie left for an advisory job in MBIE in 2023, Baxter was appointed as director for a second time, to lead the Challenge through its final year.

Vision Mātauranga is a New Zealand government policy to foster collaboration with Māori and the science community. All National Science Challenges were set up with separate Governance and Māori advisory groups, but in 2017 the Kāhui and Governance groups for AWNSC were merged into a single body, a novel approach at the time which aligned with Vision Mātauranga and gave Kāhui Māori members an equal say in decisionmaking. As part of a restructure at the five-year mark to appoint more Māori to leadership roles, Louise Parr-Brownlie became director, and Will Edwards was appointed deputy chair of the new governance group, becoming chair in 2020. In that same year $3.25m was allocated to co-designed projects that focussed particularly on Māori and Pasifika ageing. Half of the second five years of funding was allocated to Māōri-led, mostly community-driven research projects.

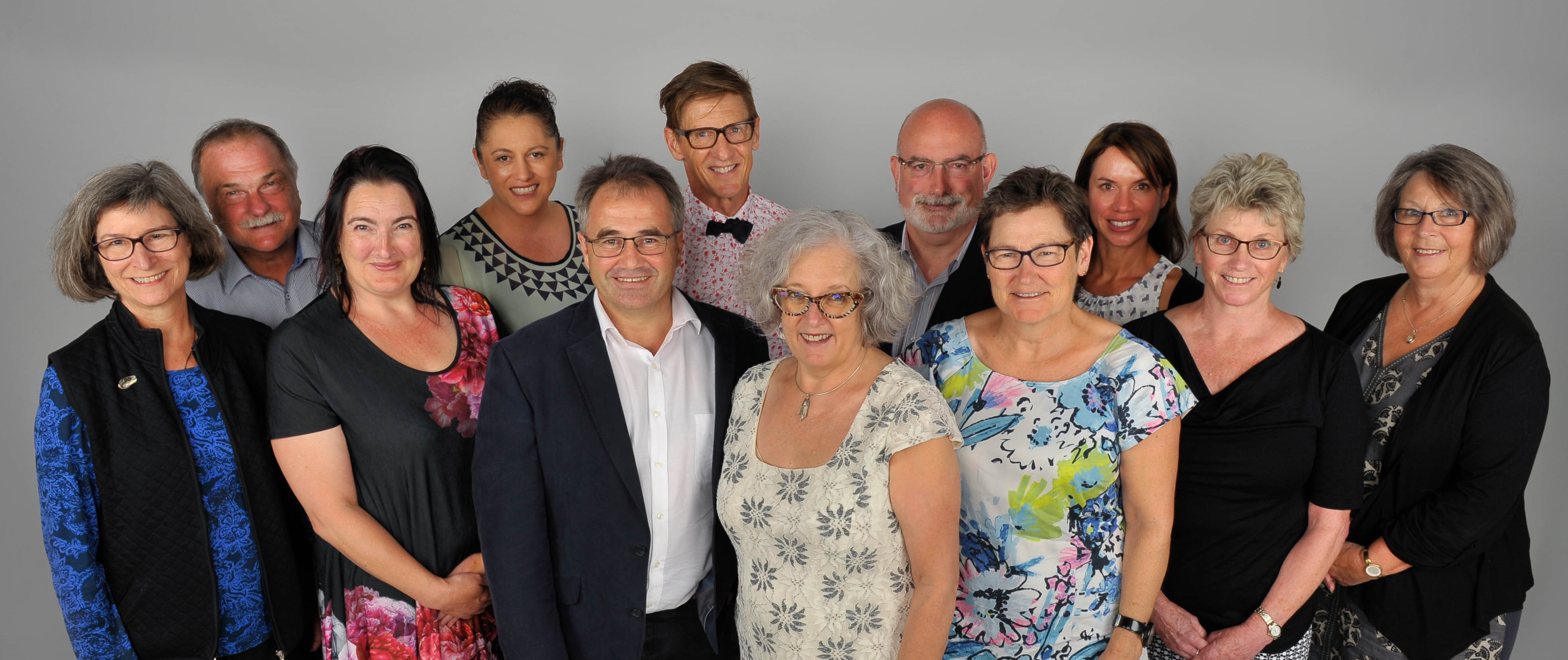
Strategic Advisory Group and other staff in 2019. Left to right: Nancy Longnecker, Len Cook, Sarah Clark, Elana Curtis, Andrew Sporle, Stephen Neville, Mary Simpson, David Baxter, Ngaire Kerse, Moana Theodore, Debra Waters

As part of a review of all National Science Challenges in 2018, the then-minister for science and innovation Megan Woods announced an additional $20.3m of funding to Ageing Well for research until 2024.

AWNSC was hosted by the University of Otago, with other research partners around New Zealand, including AgResearch, Auckland University of Technology, the Centre for Research, Evaluation, and Social Assessment (CRESA), Massey University, the University of Auckland, the University of Canterbury, the University of Waikato and Victoria University of Wellington. It worked with researchers in the National Science Challenges Healthier Lives and A Better Start, and the three Challenges collaborated in the conference He Ora te Whakapiri at Te Papa in October 2018. AWNSC also collaborated with Brain Research New Zealand on three co-funded research projects.

The final symposium for AWNSC, the culmination of the ten-year research programme, was held at Te Papa on 10–11 April 2024. Former head of the New Zealand Productivity Commission Ganesh Nana was the keynote speaker, and lead speakers included Louise Parr-Brownlie, Sarah Clark, Ofa Dewes, Joanna Hikaka, and Ngaire Kerse. The symposium saw the launch of the book Ka Mua Ka Muri, a ten-year retrospective on Ageing Well.

== Research ==
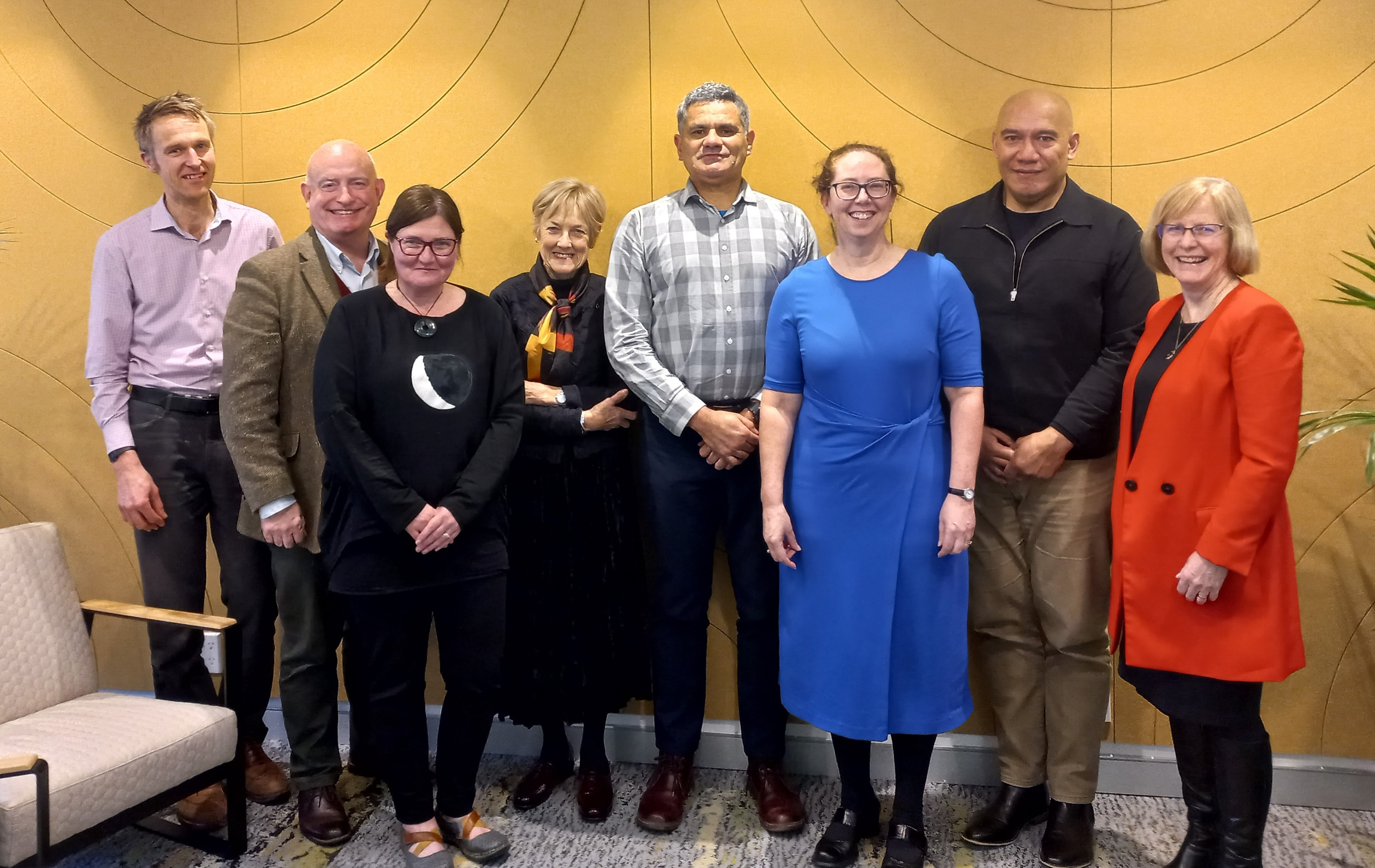
Governance Group meeting, August 2023; left to right are Andrew Lonie, David Baxter, Sarah Benwell, Adrienne von Tunzelmann, Will Edwards, Louise Parr-Brownlie, David Schaaf, and Helen Nicholson

The focus of Ageing Well was ageing-related issues in Aotearoa New Zealand; its official objective was "to harness science to sustain health and wellbeing into the later years of life." Some of the problems of ageing it was set up to address included inadequate housing, frailty, deteriorating brain health, poverty, ageism, and social isolation. In its initial years, AWNSC funded 18 research projects on a wide range of issues related to ageing, but after 2018 the focus of research narrowed into two main areas: health and wellbeing in ageing (particularly social connections and maintaining an active life); and ageing and Māori (who as an ethnic group are disproportionately disadvantaged as they age).

=== Health ===
Ageing Well's first research publication was in 2016, by Valery Feigin, Rita Krishnamurthi, and their team at AUT's National Institute for Stroke and Applied Neurosciences (NISAN). They examined the global burden and risk factors of strokes over 1990–2013, and concluded that over 90% of strokes were attributable to modifiable risk factors, and three quarters of strokes could be avoided by controlling behavioural and metabolic risk factors. They also determined that air pollution was a significant contributor to strokes, especially in low- to middle-income countries. Feigin and Krishnamurthi's team later developed digital tools for helping prevent strokes: a free mobile app, Stroke Riskometer, to measure risk; and a desktop tool for doctors, PreventS-MD. Their decades of epidemiological work in stroke risk and prevention led to them receiving the 2022 Prime Minister's Science Prize.

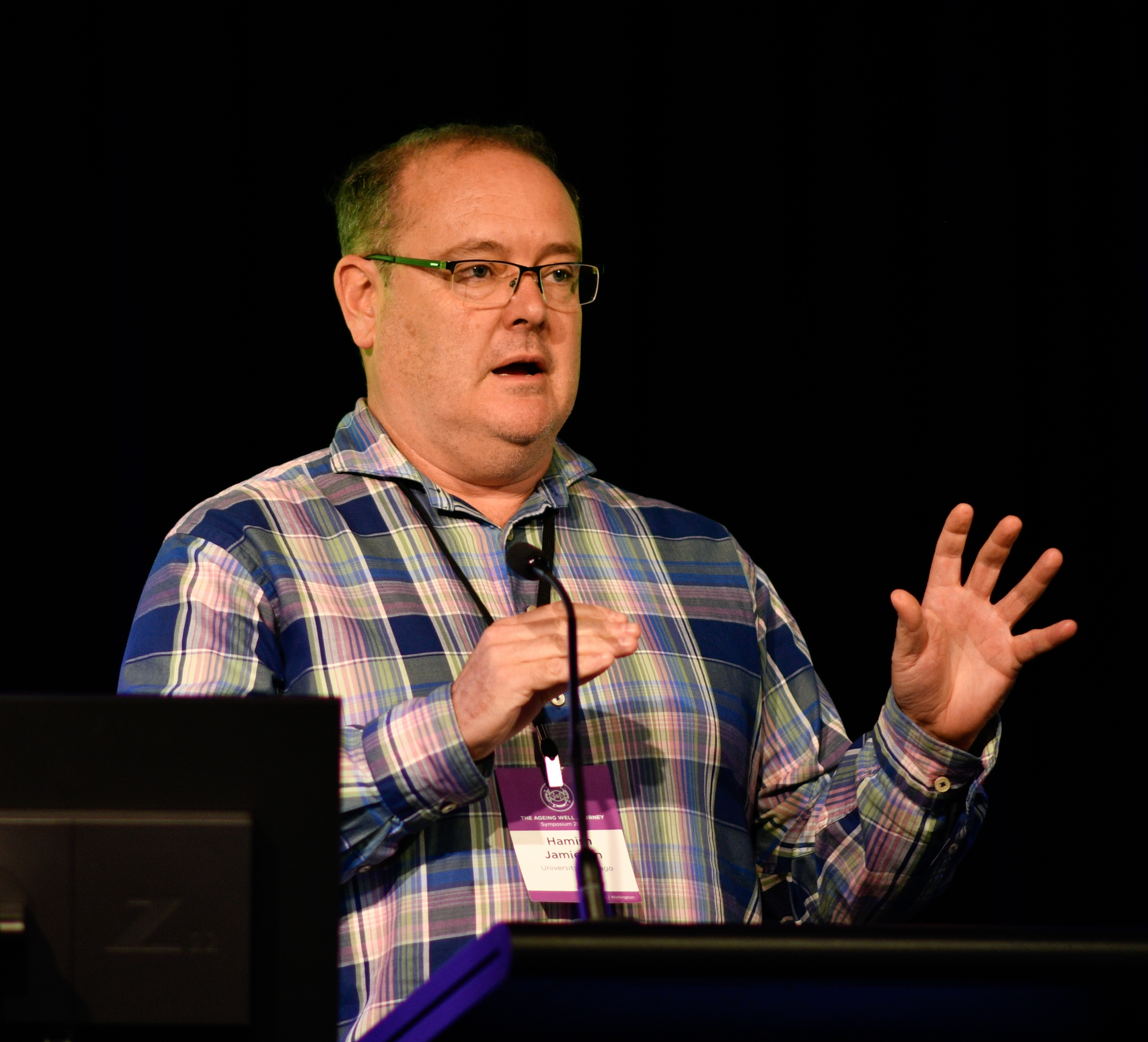
Hamish Jamieson at Ageing Well final symposium, Wellington, 2024

Work by John Reynolds on stroke recovery challenged conentional wisdom on electrical stimulation of the damaged side of the brain; instead, his research group implanted an electrical stimulator in the healthy side of the brain and turned down its activity. This seems to produce more reliable improvements of function, and their research focussed on creating an external electrical stimulator.

A team led by Hamish Jamieson examined the Drug Burden Index, a tool used by health professionals to predict medication side effects. They found it could also be used to predict falls and fractures: older people taking three or more high-scoring DBI medications were nearly twice as likely to fall and break their hip.

=== Māori and Pasifika ===
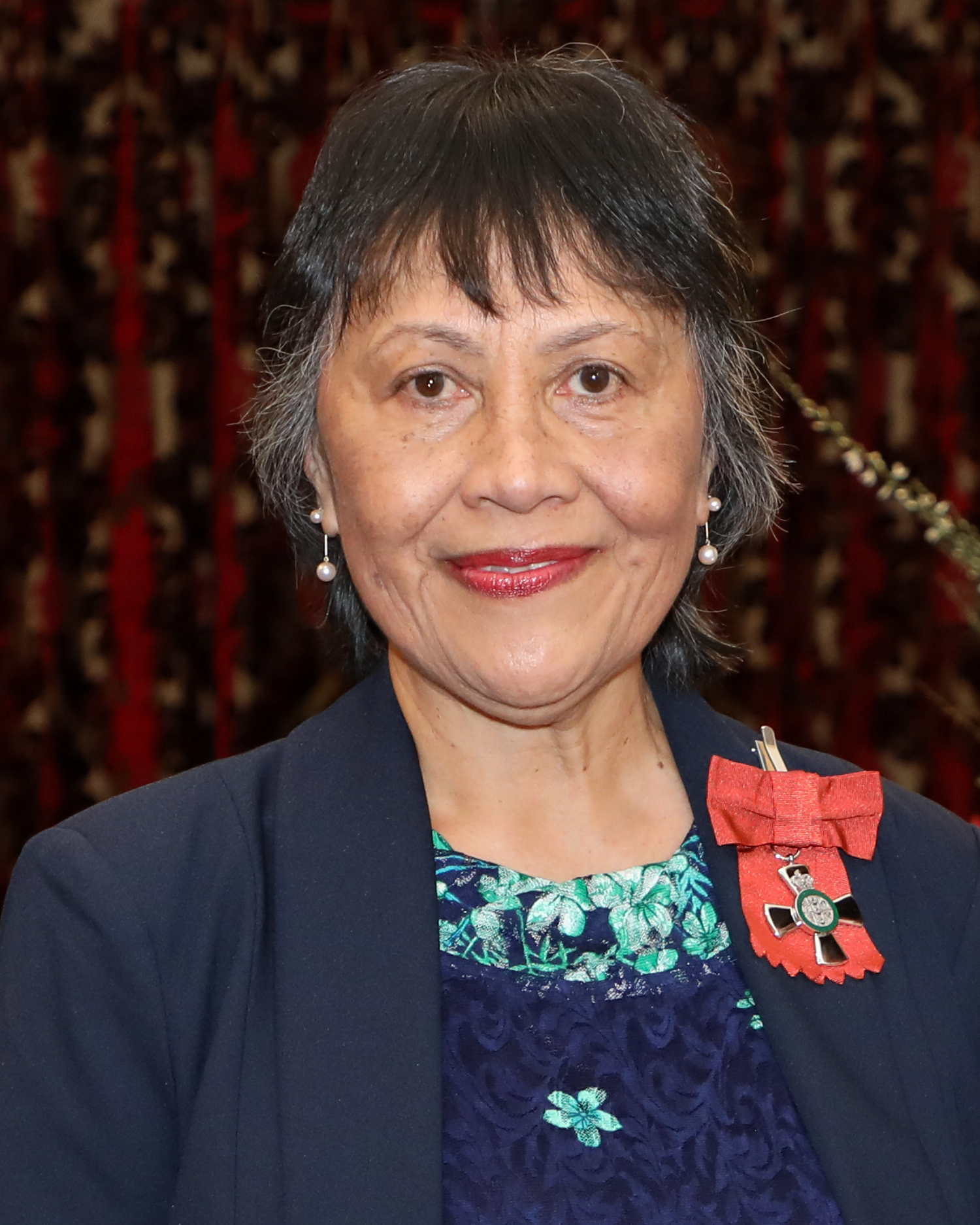
Ofa Dewes

One research area of Ageing Well was ageing in New Zealand Pacific peoples (Pasifika). Pasifika are the only New Zealand ethnic group whose mortality has stagnated rather than improved in recent years, due to the cost of medical care and cultural and language barriers. A two year study by El-Shadan (Dan) Tautolo of Samoan, Tongan, and Cook Island Pasifika grandparents, co-designed by the participants, found that a strong cultural identity was a predictor of good health. The participants identified podiatry as a focus, as older Pasifika have a higher risk of foot and lower-limb issues, and Tautolo argued for adding podiatry checks into outpatient community health assessments. Research led by Pauline Norris examined cognitive decline in aged Pasifika, and found that there were significant problems in getting a diagnosis, accessing support services, and overcoming language barriers.

External videos
- I'll Care For You (Music video on Pasifika end-of-life care)
- Elder Birdsong (Short animated film on growing old in NZ)
- Manawaroa (20 minute film featuring five older people in a retirement village)

Ofa Dewes was the principal researcher for a study on end-of-life in Pasifika, who have poor access to palliative care. Her study participants overwhelmingly wished to die at home surrounded by aiga (family), but there was insufficient support for aiga carers. At the suggestion of her study participants a music video, I'll Care For You, was created to spread the study's findings in the community. Her findings informed strategic plans developed by the Ministry of Health and Ministry of Social Development.A subsequent study looked at the needs of younger Pasifika caring for older relatives, and social support though setting up a network, which was incorporated into the Ministry for Social Development Carers' Strategy Action Plan 2019–2023.

In October 2022, Dewes and the Tongan Health Society established the Langimalie Research Centre, which began a research programme on brain health support services and the different cultural approaches needed in diverse ethnic communities: initially Tongan, Tokolauan, and Tuvaluan communities in Auckland and Wellington.

Māori in general show more positive attitudes towards ageing than non-Māori, but have poorer health statistics including chronic illness, higher social isolation, and lower quality of life. A study by Marama Muru-Lanning examined this discrepancy by working with kaumātua (older Māori), examining both the role they play in the community, their outlook, and their approach to health. Māori in the study viewed health in a holistic framework, incorporating mental, physical, and spiritual health and the state of their environment. In 2021 the team received a University of Auckland Research Excellence Medal for their work in kaumātua health. A group led by Brendan Hokowhitu had success partnering kaumātua (older Māori) with younger peers as educators and mentors, which improved kaumātua well-being and social connectedness. Anna Rolleston, funded by the New Zealand Heart Foundation, trialled a 12-week lifestyle management programme calle Ngā Pou o Rongo aimed at older Māori, developing exercise programmes grounded in Māori tradition and philosophy. Charles Waldegrave and Catherine Love began a project working with kaumātua to ascertain their values and preferences, which can be at odds with a health system and policies designed from a European perspective.

=== Social isolation ===
Sally Keeling and Hamish Jamieson of the University of Otago, Christchurch, studied loneliness and social isolation in older New Zealanders, analysing 72,000 aged-care admissions recorded in the InterRAI database. Over one in five older adults reported feeling lonely; the numbers were highest amongst older Asians (23%) but relatively low in Pasifika (17%), and loneliness increased with social deprivation. They also found social factors such as living alone, loneliness, and having stressed carers significantly increased the chance of being admitted to aged care, much more so than medical conditions like incontinence. Social Isolation and loneliness also increased the chance of depression, social anxiety, and chronic pain. Merryn Gott collaborated with Age Concern, an NGO that works with the isolated elderly, to interview older people on their loneliness and social connection, and found embarrassment about their isolation and a desire not to be a burden were common factors; some planned not to hold funerals as they felt nobody would attend. Age Concern's Accredited Visiting Service was found to be an effective counter to this loneliness and isolation. The interviews were used to make an animated short film, which was shortlisted in the WHO's 2019 Health For All Film Festival.

New Zealand is undergoing a rapid decline in home-ownership levels, from 82% owner occupation in 2001 to a predicted 50% in 2040. An increasing number of senior people are renting late in life, and Kay Saville-Smith's research group discovered that older renters are far more likely than homeowners to have chronic health problems, live in poorly maintained houses, and enter residential aged care. Saville-Smith's research informed policymaking by the Ministry of Social Development and contributed to a reform of the Residential Tenancies Act, as well as creating tools and information for seniors to help them cope better with renting.

=== Residential care ===
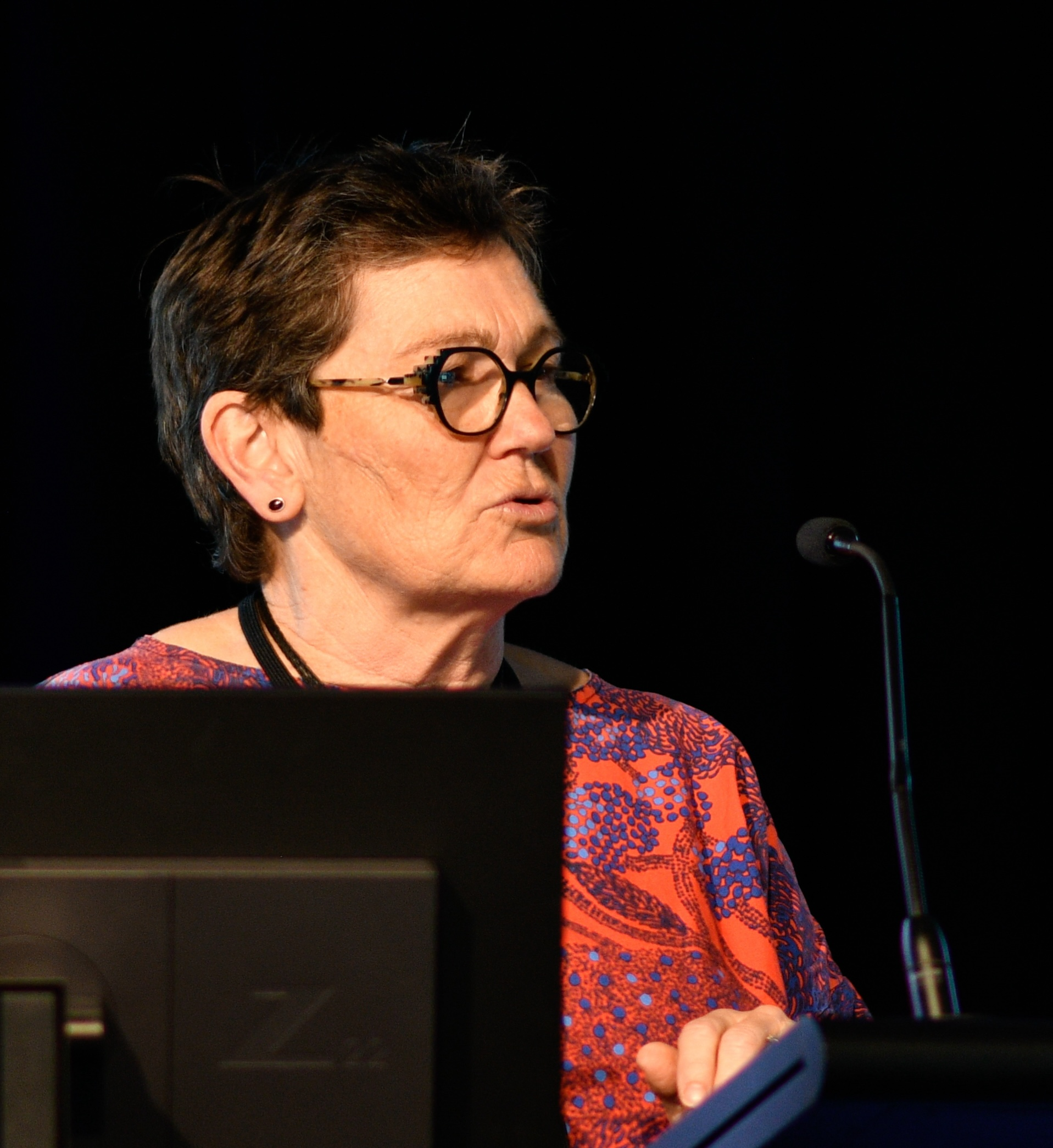
Ngaire Kerse

Several Ageing Well research projects studied the health of residents in retirement villages, analysing the national interRAI database of all residents. An initial study of 33 retirement villages led by Martin Connolly revealed around 50% of residents had cardiorespiratory symptoms and chronic pain needs that were not being addressed. Michal Boyd's research team, who had studied dementia and palliative care in residential facilities, developed a Deterioration Early Warning System (DEWS) from interRAI data to potentially be implemented in aged care facilities throughout New Zealand. DEWS, which grew out of the PhD research of Julie Daltrey, is designed for registered nurses to monitor clinical indicators (such as sleeping more, or lowered appetite) that strongly correlated with hospitalisation or death, and detect deterioration as early as possible.

As part of the AWESSOM (Ageing Well through Eating, Sleeping, Socialising and Mobility) programme coordinated by Ngaire Kerse, Hamish Jamieson used interRAI data from residential care facilities to examine multimorbidity indicators for 40,000 older people, and Ruth Teh analysed data from 45,000 people registered with Tū Ora COMPASS Health and living in the community. They found certain conditions (depression, dementia, and osteoporosis) increased the chances of admission into residential care when they were associated with heart disease or pulmonary disease.Also part of AWESSOM was Moira Smith's project on improving oral health in aged care – oral health is not part of the core policies and procedures in many facilities, but elderly residents, particularly with dementia, are at increased risk of tooth decay, which can lead to aspiration pneumonia through inhaling plaque and food remnants.

=== Frailty ===
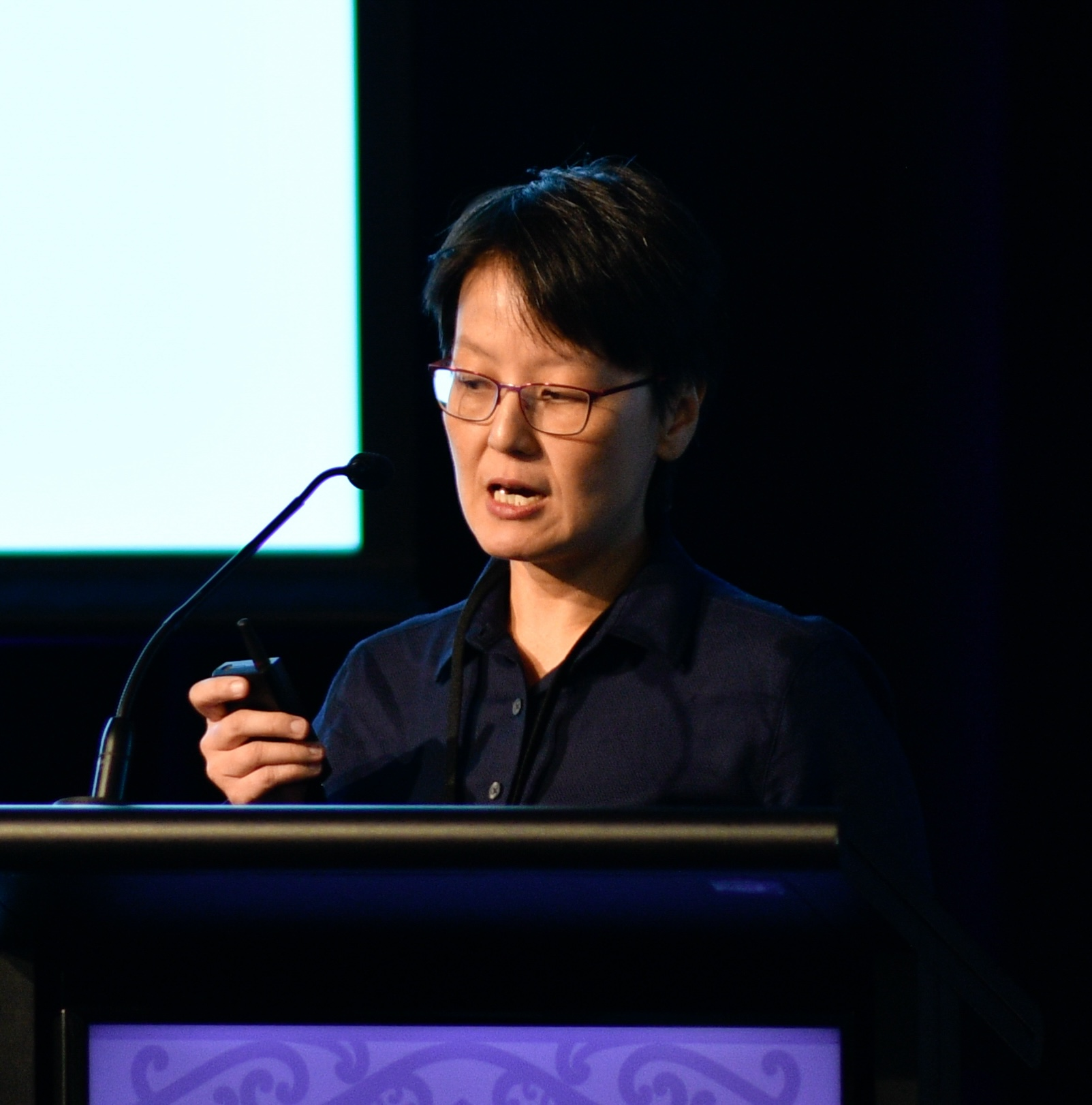
Ruth Teh

Katherine Bloomfield, one of Connolly's team, followed up with research on frailty in retirement village residents, developing a new frailty index for health professionals to use to identify high-risk patients; this was later adopted by the NZ Health Quality and Safety Commission. Twenty per cent of the residents in their study turned out to be moderately to severely frail, which was strongly associated with continuing health problems: 79% of that group subsequently had an unplanned hospitalisation.

To complement the idea of physical frailty, Ruth Teh's research team proposed a measure of social frailty—the risk of losing social connections and not fulfilling basic social needs. Teh had previously studied the effectiveness of two programmes for seniors that promoted strength and balance and improved cooking skills, finding they were not only stalling physical fraily but building social connection. These programmes had low participation rates by Māori however, so a subsequent study trialled a co-designed gardening initiative with older Māori to promote exercise and social connection. They received Lottery Health Research funding to develop the idea of gardening as an "outdoor gym".

== Symposia ==
- Aged Care and Housing: evidence-based solutions for Aotearoa (2022). Hybrid event focussed on housing and residential aged care. Symposium report (PDF).

== Publications ==
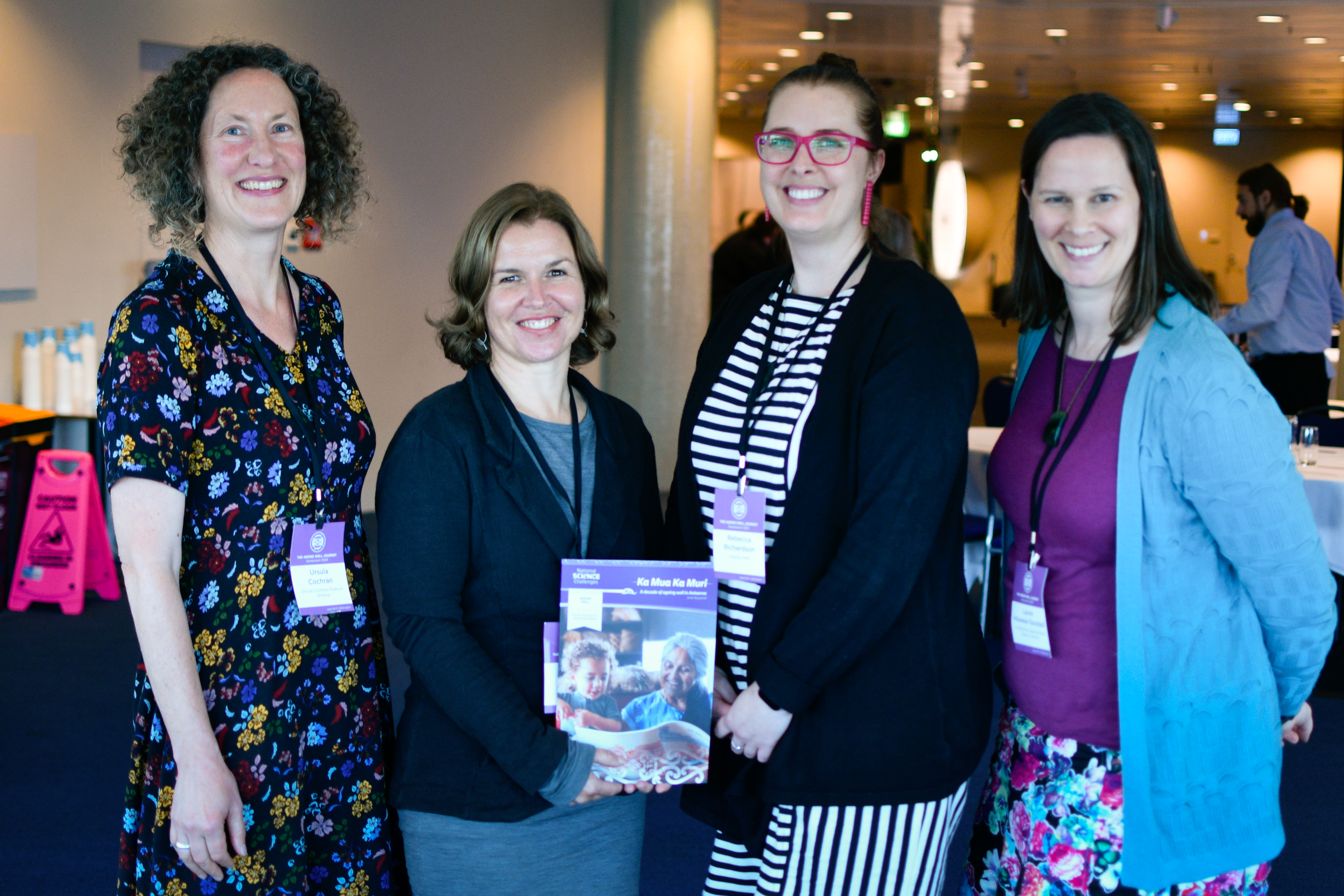
Launch of Ka Mua Ka Muri at the Ageing Well final symposium, April 2024

- Ageing Well (2021). Celebrating Ageing Well: The first five years of the Ageing Well National Science Challenge (PDF). Dunedin: University of Otago. ISBN 978-0-473-57902-9. Wikidata Q124444554.
- Evidence for Health and Wellbeing in Aotearoa New Zealand (PDF), Dunedin: University of Otago, September 2023, Wikidata Q124618162
- Ageing Well (2024). Ka Mua Ka Muri: A decade of ageing well in Aotearoa and beyond (PDF). Dunedin: University of Otago. ISBN 978-0-473-71126-9. Wikidata Q125684589.
