= Yolanda van Heezik =

New Zealand ecologist

- Education: University of Otago
- Scientific career
- Workplaces: University of Otago
- Thesis: The growth and diet of the yellow-eyed penguin, Megadyptes antipodes (1988)

Yolanda van Heezik is a New Zealand academic and a professor of zoology at the University of Otago. She is considered one of New Zealand's first urban ecologists.

In 1988 van Heezik completed a PhD at the University of Otago in animal biology, writing her thesis on penguin ecology. Her research is focused on birds and other wildlife in urban areas, and biodiversity of gardens. She also researches and writes about children's connections with nature.

== Personal life ==
She married fellow Otago Zoology Ph.D. graduate Phil Seddon prior to moving to Saudi Arabia. They have a son who was born in 1997.

== Selected works ==
=== Book ===
- Saint Jalme, M., van Heezik, Yolanda, Paillat, P., & Eichaner, X. (2001). Propagation of the houbara bustard
- van Heezik, Yolanda, & Freeman, Claire (2018). Children, Nature and Cities: Rethinking the Connections.

=== Journal articles ===
- Danielle F Shanahan; Thomas Astell-Burt; Elizabeth A Barber; et al. (10 June 2019). "Nature-Based Interventions for Improving Health and Wellbeing: The Purpose, the People and the Outcomes". Sports. 7 (6). doi:10.3390/sports7060141. ISSN 2075-4663. PMC 6628071. PMID 31185675. Wikidata Q92662057.
- Yolanda van Heezik; Claire Freeman; Katherine Davidson; Blake Lewis (27 April 2020). "Uptake and Engagement of Activities to Promote Native Species in Private Gardens". Environmental Management. 66 (1): 42–55. doi:10.1007/s00267-020-01294-5. ISSN 0364-152X. PMID 32338302. Wikidata Q93250467.
- Claire Freeman; Debra L Waters; Yvette Buttery; Yolanda van Heezik (25 January 2019). "The impacts of ageing on connection to nature: the varied responses of older adults". Health & Place. 56: 24–33. doi:10.1016/j.healthplace.2019.01.010. ISSN 1353-8292. PMID 30690279. Wikidata Q91251743.
