= Tania Cassidy =

New Zealand professor of physical education

- Born: 1964 (age 61–62)

Academic background
- Education: Deakin University
- Theses: Politics, policies & physical education: the development of University bursaries physical education (1995); Investigating the pedagogical process in physical education teacher education (2000)

Academic work
- Institutions: University of Otago
- Doctoral students: Anne-Marie Jackson

Tania Gaye Cassidy (born 1964) is a New Zealand academic, and is a full professor at the University of Otago, specialising in sports pedagogy, especially that of sports coaching.

== Academic career ==
Cassidy completed a Masters of Physical Education at the University of Otago, and then moved to Deakin University in Australia to complete a PhD titled Investigating the pedagogical process in physical education teacher education. Cassidy then joined the faculty of the University of Otago, rising to associate professor in 2015, and full professor in 2024.

Cassidy is interested in sports pedagogy, including the pedagogy of sports coaching, talent identification and selection, and athlete learning and development. Cassidy has spoken about the lack of emphasis on morals in New Zealand rugby, sports coaching as a growth industry, and how centralised systems for high-performance sports do not meet the needs of all athletes. Her 2009 book on sports coaching was one of Routledge's bestselling sports books, and has arguably helped influence the development of coaching. She has held advisory roles with New Zealand Hockey, New Zealand Cricket and New Zealand Football, and chaired Otago Hockey. She was an ambassador for the 2022 Women's Cricket World Cup tournament. Cassidy has also helped develop programmes for Taiwanese coaches and athletes.

Cassidy has a visiting professor at University College Cork, Ireland. She is on the editorial board for several journals, including International Journal of Sports Science and Coaching, International Journal of Sports Psychology, and the New Zealand Physical Educator.

A notable doctoral student of Cassidy's is Anne-Marie Jackson.

== Selected works ==
=== Books ===
- Tania Cassidy, Paul Potrac and Steven Rynne. Understanding Sports Coaching: The Pedagogical, Social and Cultural Foundations of Sports Practice (2004, 2009, 2106; Routledge) ISBN 9781032026312
- Tania Cassidy, Phil Handcock, Brian Gearity, Lisette Burrows. Understanding Strength and Conditioning as Sport Coaching: Bridging the Biophysical, Pedagogical and Sociocultural Foundations of Practice (2020, Routledge) ISBN 9781138301825

=== Journal articles ===
- Nancy J Rehrer; Freeman, Claire; Cassidy, Tania; Waters, Debra; Gary E Barclay; Wilson, Noela (2011). "Through the eyes of young people: favourite places for physical activity". Scandinavian Journal of Public Health. 39 (5): 492–500. doi:10.1177/1403494811401478. PMID 21406480. Wikidata Q38550071.
- Laura Purdy; Robyn Jones; Cassidy, Tania (2009). "Negotiation and capital: athletes' use of power in an elite men's rowing program". Sport Education and Society. 14 (3): 321–338. doi:10.1080/13573320903037796. Wikidata Q124726974.
- Cassidy, Tania (2010). "Understanding the Change Process: Valuing What it is That Coaches Do". International Journal of Sports Science and Coaching. 5 (2): 187–191. doi:10.1260/1747-9541.5.2.187. Wikidata Q124726973.
- Cassidy, Tania (2010). "Holism in Sports Coaching: Beyond Humanistic Psychology". International Journal of Sports Science and Coaching. 5 (4): 439–501. doi:10.1260/1747-9541.5.4.439. Wikidata Q124726969.
