= Von Tunzelmann =

Von Tunzelmann is a surname primarily associated with a New Zealand family of Baltic German descent. Notable people with the surname include:

- Adrienne von Tunzelmann (born c. 1947), New Zealand executive director
- Alex von Tunzelmann (born 1977), British historian
- Alexander von Tunzelmann (1877–1957), New Zealand sailor and explorer
- Nicholas von Tunzelmann (1828–1900), German-British explorer who settled in Queenstown, New Zealand

== See also ==
- Von Tunzelmann Point, Antarctica
