= Sopoaga =

Sopoaga is a surname. Notable people with the surname include:

- Enele Sopoaga (born 1956), Tuvaluan diplomat and politician
  - Sopoaga Ministry
- Fa’afetai Sopoaga, Samoan-New Zealand Pacific public health researcher
- Isaac Sopoaga (born 1981), Samoan-born American football player
- Lima Sopoaga (born 1991), rugby union player
- Saufatu Sopoanga (1952–2020), Tuvaluan politician
- Tupou Sopoaga (born 1992), New Zealand professional rugby union player
