= Leigh Hale =

New Zealand physiotherapy academic

Leigh Anne Hale
- Education: University of the Witwatersrand
- Scientific career
- Fields: Physiotherapy
- Workplaces: University of Otago
- Thesis: The problems experienced by people with stroke living in Soweto, South Africa. (2002)

Leigh Anne Hale is a New Zealand physiotherapy academic, and as of 2019, is a full professor at the University of Otago.

== Academic career ==
After a 2002 PhD titled 'The problems experienced by people with stroke living in Soweto, South Africa.' at the University of the Witwatersrand, Hale moved to the University of Otago, rising to full professor.

Hale has run large research projects related to persistent pain and community exercise.

== Selected works ==
- Campbell, A. John, M. Clare Robertson, Steven J. La Grow, Ngaire M. Kerse, Gordon F. Sanderson, Robert J. Jacobs, Dianne M. Sharp, and Leigh A. Hale. "Randomised controlled trial of prevention of falls in people aged≥ 75 with severe visual impairment: the VIP trial." Bmj 331, no. 7520 (2005): 817.
- Hale, Leigh A., Jaya Pal, and Ines Becker. "Measuring free-living physical activity in adults with and without neurologic dysfunction with a triaxial accelerometer." Archives of physical medicine and rehabilitation 89, no. 9 (2008): 1765–1771.
- Hale, Leigh A., Debra Waters, and Peter Herbison. "A randomized controlled trial to investigate the effects of water-based exercise to improve falls risk and physical function in older adults with lower-extremity osteoarthritis." Archives of physical medicine and rehabilitation 93, no. 1 (2012): 27–34.
- Mulligan, Hilda F., Leigh A. Hale, Lisa Whitehead, and G. David Baxter. "Barriers to physical activity for people with long-term neurological conditions: a review study." Adapted Physical Activity Quarterly 29, no. 3 (2012): 243–265.
