= Kay Saville-Smith =

Sociologist in New Zealand

Kay Saville-Smith MNZM
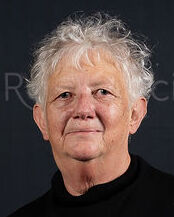
- Saville-Smith in 2024
- Born: 1957
- Awards: Dame Joan Metge Medal, Member of the New Zealand Order of Merit

Academic background
- Education: University of Canterbury, University of Lancaster
- Theses: Reproducers and producers: a model for the analysis of women (1982); Cumbria's encounter with the East Indies c.1680-1829: gentry and middling provincial families seeking success (2016)

Katherine Julie Saville-Smith MNZM (known as Kay) is a New Zealand sociologist, specialising in issues related to housing. In 2018 Saville-Smith was appointed a Member of the New Zealand Order of Merit for services to seniors and housing. In 2024 the Royal Society Te Apārangi awarded Saville-Smith the Metge Medal.

== Academic career ==
Saville-Smith completed a master's degree at the University of Canterbury in 1982, followed by a PhD titled Cumbria's encounter with the East Indies c.1680-1829: gentry and middling provincial families seeking success at the University of Lancaster in 2016. Her doctoral research was inspired by family connections in Cumbria, but also by the loss of archival sources on her first study choice, the decline of the region's iron industry. In 2018 Boydell Press published a book Provincial Society and Empire: The Cumbrian Counties and the East Indies, 1680-1829 based on Saville-Smith's doctoral research.

Saville-Smith is a sociologist, and has researched housing in New Zealand for thirty years. Since 1994 she has been director of the Centre for Research, Evaluation and Social Assessment (Cresa). Saville-Smith is interested in ways to enable better planning, building and adaptation of housing. Her research has covered issues such as housing needs and condition, accessibility, leaky homes, fuel poverty, the repair and maintenance of houses, community resilience, and retirement villages.

Saville-Smith has led research in both the Ageing Well and the Building Better Homes, Towns and Cities National Science Challenges. She has served on ministerial advisory committees relating to warm homes and house prices, and is a trustee of the Marlborough Sustainable Housing Trust.

== Honours and awards ==
In the 2018 Queen's Birthday Honours, Saville-Smith was appointed a Member of the New Zealand Order of Merit for services to seniors and housing. In 2024 the Royal Society Te Apārangi awarded Saville-Smith the Metge Medal, for "her work at the forefront of New Zealand housing research, working with communities, government, and private and public sectors".

== Selected works ==
- Saville-Smith, K.J. (April 2018). Provincial Society and Empire: The Cumbrian Counties and the East Indies, 1680-1829. Boydell Press. ISBN 9781783272815.
- Howden, Philippa Lynne; Anna Matheson; Crane, Julian; Viggers, Helen Elizabeth; Malcolm Cunningham; Blakely, Tony; Cunningham, Chris; Woodward, Alistair Jack; Saville, Kay; O'Dea, Des; Martin Kennedy; Michael Baker; Nick Waipara; Ralph Chapman; Gabrielle Davie (2007). "Effect of insulating existing houses on health inequality: cluster randomised study in the community". The BMJ. 334 (7591): 460. doi:10.1136/bmj.39070.573032.80. PMC 1808149. PMID 17324975. Wikidata Q35658634.
- Howden, Philippa Lynne; Saville, Kay; Crane, Julian; Wilson, Nick (2005). "Risk factors for mold in housing: a national survey". Indoor Air. 15 (6): 469–476. doi:10.1111/j.1600-0668.2005.00389.x. PMID 16268836. Wikidata Q47697282.
- Baker, Michael George; Zhang, Jane; Blakely, Tony; Crane, Julian; Saville, Kay; Howden, Philippa Lynne (2016). "Collaborating with a social housing provider supports a large cohort study of the health effects of housing conditions". BMC Public Health. 16: 159. doi:10.1186/s12889-016-2730-9. PMC 4754881. PMID 26883320. Wikidata Q35925323.
- Nigel Isaacs; Saville, Kay; Michael Camilleri; Lisa Burrough (2010). "Energy in New Zealand houses: comfort, physics and consumption". Building Research and Information. 38 (5): 470–480. doi:10.1080/09613218.2010.494383. Wikidata Q131351748.
- Roman Jaques; Mark Jones; Nick Marston; Saville, Kay; Patricia Shaw (2015). "Storm resilience of New Zealand housing and the implications for older people – Preliminary study". International Journal of Sustainable Built Environment. 4 (2): 341–347. doi:10.1016/j.ijsbe.2015.05.001. Wikidata Q131351743.
- James, Beverley Lorraine; Rehm, Michael; Saville, Kay (2016). "Impacts of leaky homes and leaky building stigma on older homeowners". Pacific Rim Property Research Journal. 23 (1): 15–34. doi:10.1080/14445921.2016.1266983. Wikidata Q131351742.
- Saville, Kay (2020). "Calcutta, Cumbria, Convict: A Eurasian progress through Empire". Journal of Colonialism and Colonial History. 21 (1). doi:10.1353/cch.2020.0004. Wikidata Q131351741.
