= John Reynolds (researcher) =

New Zealand academic

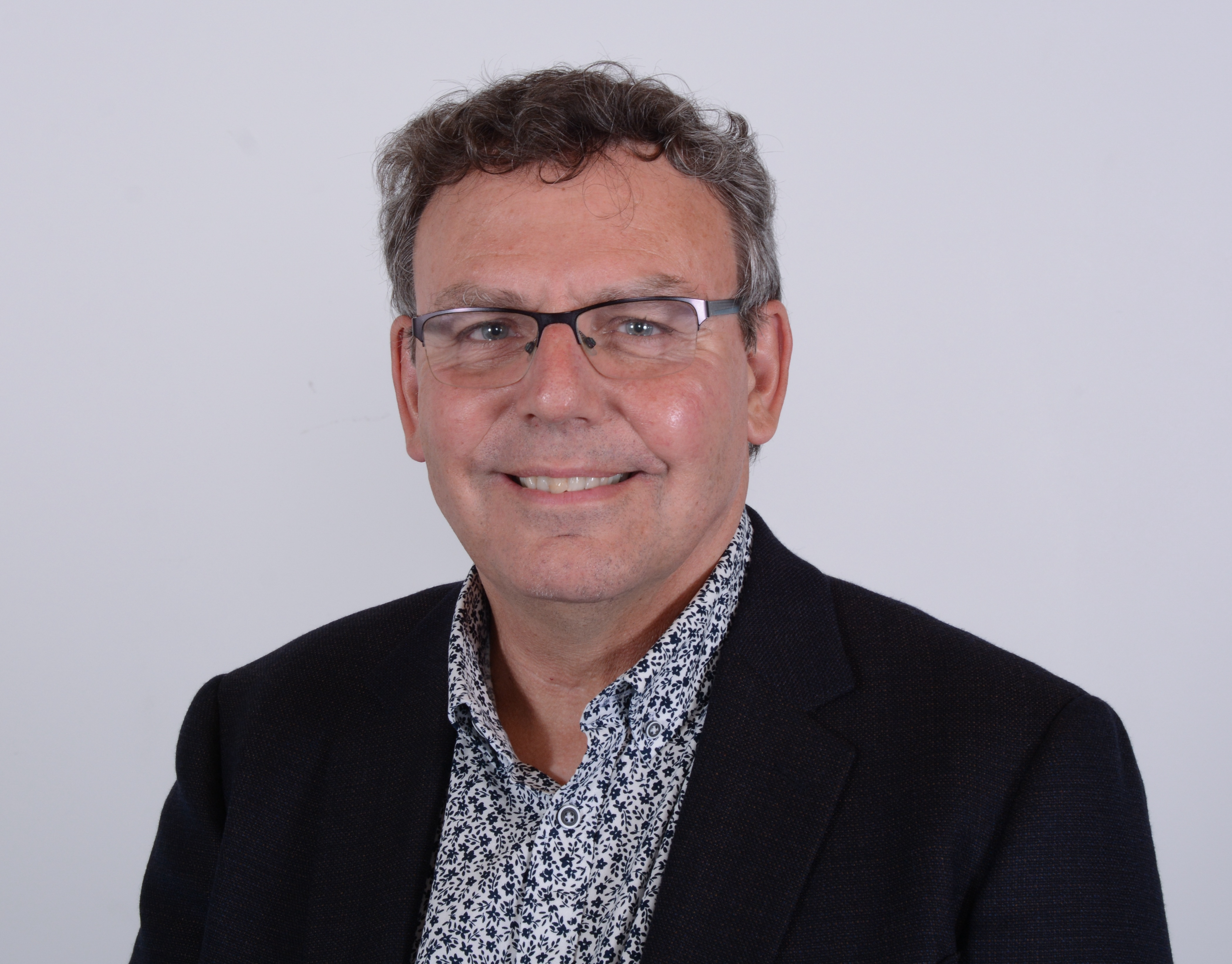
- Education: University of Otago
- Scientific career
- Fields: Medical research
- Workplaces: University of Otago
- Thesis: Effects of substantia nigra stimulation on synaptic plasticity in the corticostriatal pathway (2000)

John Noble James Reynolds is a New Zealand medical researcher and academic, and a full professor at the University of Otago's Department of Anatomy, studying learning and movement generation in the cerebral cortex and basal ganglia with applications in stroke recovery and Parkinson's disease.

== Academic career ==
Reynolds graduated from the University of Otago with a medical degree in 1994, had a medical practice for several years, and then returned to complete his PhD. In 2016 he was appointed a full professor in the Department of Anatomy of the University of Otago.

Reynolds received an Ako Aotearoa teaching award in 2008, and in 2017 was appointed the first director of the Heath Sciences First Year (HSFY) programme, which attracts 1300–1400 enrolments a year.

In 2010 Reynolds received an inaugural Rutherford Discovery Fellowship for a research programme on rebalancing brain function in both stroke recovery and preventing the progression of epileptic seizures. He has also received a Brain and Behavior Research Foundation Young Investigator Award

In 2019 Reynolds became one the few New Zealand researchers to be funded simultaneously by the three largest national research grants: the Marsden Fund, MBIE, and the Health Research Council. Along with Philippa Howden-Chapman and Greg Cook, he was one of only three University of Otago researchers to have held all three concurrently.

Reynolds is part of the Ageing Well National Science Challenge, spent five years as chair of the Scientific Advisory Committee of the Neurological Foundation of NZ, and is an associate director of the Centre of Research Excellence Brain Research New Zealand.

== Research ==
Reynolds' work is focused on the patterns of brain cell activity in both normal and disordered brains: learning, the mechanism of memory, and the effects of Parkinson's disease and strokes on brain circuitry. Neuroplasticity – how the brain is able to "rewire its circuits" – and its application to neuralogical disorders was the focus of his three largest research grants. Projects include development of targeted drug therapy for Parkinson's disease, and stimulation therapies for tinnitus and stroke recovery. His research group study the effects of neuromodulation in changing synaptic plasticity and restoring normal learning and movement.

== Selected works ==
- Vautrelle, Nicolas; Coizet, Véronique; Leriche, Mariana; Dahan, Lionel; Schulz, Jan M.; Zhang, Yan-Feng; Zeghbib, Abdelhafid; Overton, Paul G.; Bracci, Enrico; Redgrave, Peter; Reynolds, John N.J. (2024). "Sensory Reinforced Corticostriatal Plasticity". Current Neuropharmacology. 22 (9): 1513–1527. doi:10.2174/1570159X21666230801110359. PMC 11097983. PMID 37533245.
- Reynolds, John N. J.; Avvisati, Riccardo; Dodson, Paul D.; Fisher, Simon D.; Oswald, Manfred J.; Wickens, Jeffery R.; Zhang, Yan-Feng (11 March 2022). "Coincidence of cholinergic pauses, dopaminergic activation and depolarisation of spiny projection neurons drives synaptic plasticity in the striatum". Nature Communications. 13 (1): 1296. Bibcode:2022NatCo..13.1296R. doi:10.1038/s41467-022-28950-0. ISSN 2041-1723. PMC 8917208. PMID 35277506.
- Zhang, Yan-Feng; Reynolds, John N.J.; Cragg, Stephanie J. (2018). "Pauses in Cholinergic Interneuron Activity Are Driven by Excitatory Input and Delayed Rectification, with Dopamine Modulation". Neuron. 98 (5): 918–925.e3. doi:10.1016/j.neuron.2018.04.027. PMC 5993868. PMID 29754751.
- Fisher, Simon D.; Robertson, Paul B.; Black, Melony J.; Redgrave, Peter; Sagar, Mark A.; Abraham, Wickliffe C.; Reynolds, John N.J. (24 August 2017). "Reinforcement determines the timing dependence of corticostriatal synaptic plasticity in vivo". Nature Communications. 8 (1): 334. Bibcode:2017NatCo...8..334F. doi:10.1038/s41467-017-00394-x. ISSN 2041-1723. PMC 5571189. PMID 28839128.
- Reynolds, John N. J.; Hyland, Brian I.; Wickens, Jeffery R. (2001). "A cellular mechanism of reward-related learning". Nature. 413 (6851): 67–70. Bibcode:2001Natur.413...67R. doi:10.1038/35092560. ISSN 0028-0836. PMID 11544526.
