= Metge Medal =

Social sciences award in New Zealand

The Dame Joan Metge Medal was established by the Royal Society of New Zealand in 2006, in recognition of the contribution of Dame Joan Metge to social sciences. Since 2017, the medal has been referred to as the Metge Medal. The medal is awarded every two years to a New Zealand social scientist for excellence in teaching, research and/or other activities contributing to capacity building and beneficial relationships between research participants.

== Recipients ==
The Dame Joan Metge Medal was first awarded in 2008 and recipients of the medal have been:

Year	Recipient	Citation
2008	Diana Lennon	Her research as a paediatrician scientist has made a major impact on the lives of New Zealand children
2008	Philippa Howden-Chapman	Her research has had a major impact on our understanding of the link between housing, energy and health
2010	Richie Poulton	For his work as director of the University of Otago longitudinal study which is following the health and development of more than 1000 babies born in Dunedin in 1972/3 providing substantial contributions to new knowledge
2010	Richard Bedford	For his contribution to the development of social sciences over a long period, and has made major contributions to new knowledge in the field of migration, particularly in the Asia-Pacific region
2012	Janet Holmes	For her outstanding contribution to linguistics
2012	Linda Tuhiwai Smith	For her outstanding contribution in inspiring, mentoring and developing the capacity of Māori researchers through teaching and research
2014	Alison Jones	For the significant impact she has made on New Zealand educational research and practice, particularly on Māori-Pākehā educational relationships and women's education at tertiary level
2016	Stuart McNaughton	For his contributions to the building of research capacity in educational sciences, advancing literacy and language development, and for his evidence-based impact on educational policy both nationally and internationally
2018	Suzanne Pitama	For her considerable contribution to inspiring and developing new research capacity and knowledge for health professional education to address critical Indigenous health inequities in Aotearoa New Zealand
2020	Steven Ratuva	For his mahi on ethnicity, racism and affirmative action, with expertise in conflict and social protection
2022	Yvonne Underhill-Sem	For intellectual leadership on gendered social relations and development studies which have transformed development as accepted practice in Aotearoa and the Pacific
2024	Kay Saville-Smith	For her work at the forefront of New Zealand housing research, working with communities, government, and private and public sectors
