= Yvonne Underhill-Sem =

New Zealand Pacific development geographer

Yvonne Underhill-Sem MNZM FRSNZ
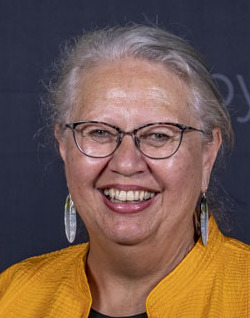
- Underhill in 2022
- Born: Cook Islands
- Employer: University of Auckland
- Awards: Metge Medal (2022)

Yvonne Jasmine Te Ruki Rangi o Tangaroa Underhill MNZM FRSNZ is a New Zealand Pacific development geographer. She is a professor at the University of Auckland, where she teaches Pacific studies.

== Early life and education ==
Underhill was born in the Cook Islands, specifically Rarotonga, is of Cook Island, Niuean and Pākehā descent and moved to Porirua at a young age, where she completed her primary and secondary education.

Underhill went on to complete her BA in Human Geography and Anthropology and BA (Hons) in Human Geography at Victoria University of Wellington, PGDip in Population Studies and MA in Geography at University of Hawaii, and PhD in Geography at University of Waikato.

== Career ==
Underhill is a professor at the University of Auckland, where she teaches Pacific studies since 2021, Te Wānanga o Waipapa (Maori Studies and Pacific Studies) and is the acting co-head of school. There she was Director of Development Studies from 2007 to 2014.

From 2015 to 2018, she was deputy chair of the Inaugural Pacific Performance Based Review Fund, where she is appointed to be inaugural Deputy Moderator (Pacific) in 2026. She helped establish Oxfam in the Pacific in 2015, she served as Co-Chair of the Advisory Research Group for Pacific Women Shaping Pacific Development between 2017 and 2019, and since 2020 has helped start the Pacific Feminist Fund, a grant-making organisation to deal with gender inequality in the Pacific, which launched in mid-2023.

== Awards and recognition ==
In 2022, Underhill was awarded the Metge Medal by the Royal Society Te Apārangi for "excellence and relationship-building in the social science research community". In the 2024 New Year Honours, Underhill was appointed a Member of the New Zealand Order of Merit, for services to tertiary education and Pacific development.

Underhill also received several other awards, including the Fulbright Senior Scholar Award in 2010/11 and World University Network (WUN) Award in 2010.

In 2025 Underhill was elected a Fellow of the Royal Society Te Apārangi.
