= Pauline Norris =

New Zealand academic

Pauline Toni Norris
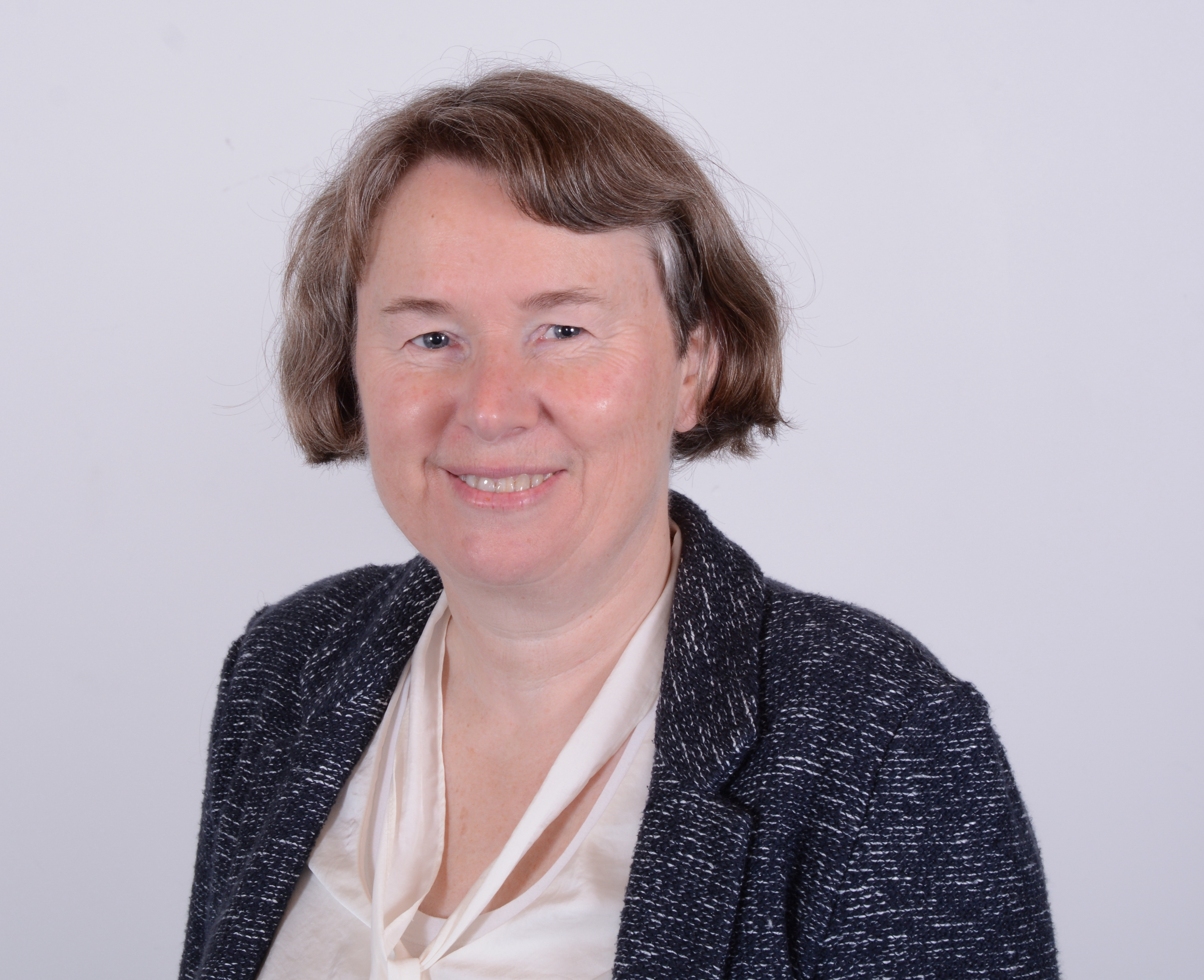
- Born: 1964 (age 61–62)
- Education: Victoria University of Wellington
- Scientific career
- Fields: Medical research
- Workplaces: University of Otago
- Thesis: The negotiation and re-negotiation of occupational control : a study of retail pharmacy in New Zealand, 1930-1990 (1993)

Pauline Toni Norris (born 1964) is a New Zealand academic, and as of 2019 is a full professor at the University of Otago.

== Academic career ==
After a 1993 PhD titled 'The negotiation and re-negotiation of occupational control : a study of retail pharmacy in New Zealand, 1930-1990' at Victoria University of Wellington, Norris moved to the University of Otago, rising to full professor.

== Selected works ==
- Norris, Pauline, Andrew Herxheimer, Joel Lexchin, Peter Mansfield, and World Health Organization. Drug promotion: what we know, what we have yet to learn: Reviews of materials in the WHO/HAI database on drug promotion. No. WHO/EDM/PAR/2004.3. Geneva: World Health Organization, 2005.
- Watson, Margaret Camilla, P. Norris, and A. G. Granas. "A systematic review of the use of simulated patients and pharmacy practice research." International Journal of Pharmacy Practice 14, no. 2 (2006): 83–93.
- Norris, Pauline. "How ‘we’are different from ‘them’: occupational boundary maintenance in the treatment of musculo‐skeletal problems." Sociology of Health & Illness 23, no. 1 (2001): 24-43.
- Capstick, Stuart, Pauline Norris, Faafetai Sopoaga, and Wale Tobata. "Relationships between health and culture in Polynesia–A review." Social Science & Medicine 68, no. 7 (2009): 1341–1348.
