= New Zealand Centre for Sustainable Cities =

New Zealand organisation

- Type: Research institute
- Headquarters: University of Otago, Wellington
- Director: Philippa Howden-Chapman
- Website: sustainablecities.org.nz

The New Zealand Centre for Sustainable Cities states that it is an inter-disciplinary research centre "dedicated to providing the research base for innovative solutions to the economic, social, environmental and cultural development" of New Zealand urban centres. It states "87% of New Zealanders live in cities. The health and well-being of a significant proportion of (New Zealand) population is reliant on developing environments that take into account the connections between transport, design, energy, health and governance and other issues."

Professor Philippa Howden-Chapman of the University of Otago is the director and states:

The centre builds on a strong existing network of expertise. It is a partnership, led by the University of Otago, of six universities—Otago, Canterbury, Victoria, Massey, Waikato and Auckland—two Crown Research Institutes, Landcare and NIWA and BRANZ. It is positioned to work with regional councils, territorial local authorities and national agencies, with national frameworks that can accelerate urban sustainability.

Professor Howden-Chapman has been quoted as expressing concern in 2012 at the clear absence of a central government agency in New Zealand that sees urban development and sustainable cities as a priority part of its brief.

The centre has been instrumental in researching the application of indigenous knowledge to sustainable urban design.

== See also ==
- Sustainable city – City designed with consideration for social, economic, and environmental impact
- Transition town – Community with core principles of self-sufficiency
- Sustainable design – Environmentally conscious design
- Ecodistrict – Environmental planning
- Zero-carbon city – City that has no carbon footprint
- Carfree city – Urban area absent of motor vehicles
- Urban design – Designing and shaping of human settlements
