= Ofa Dewes =

New Zealand academic

Ofa Dewes MNZM
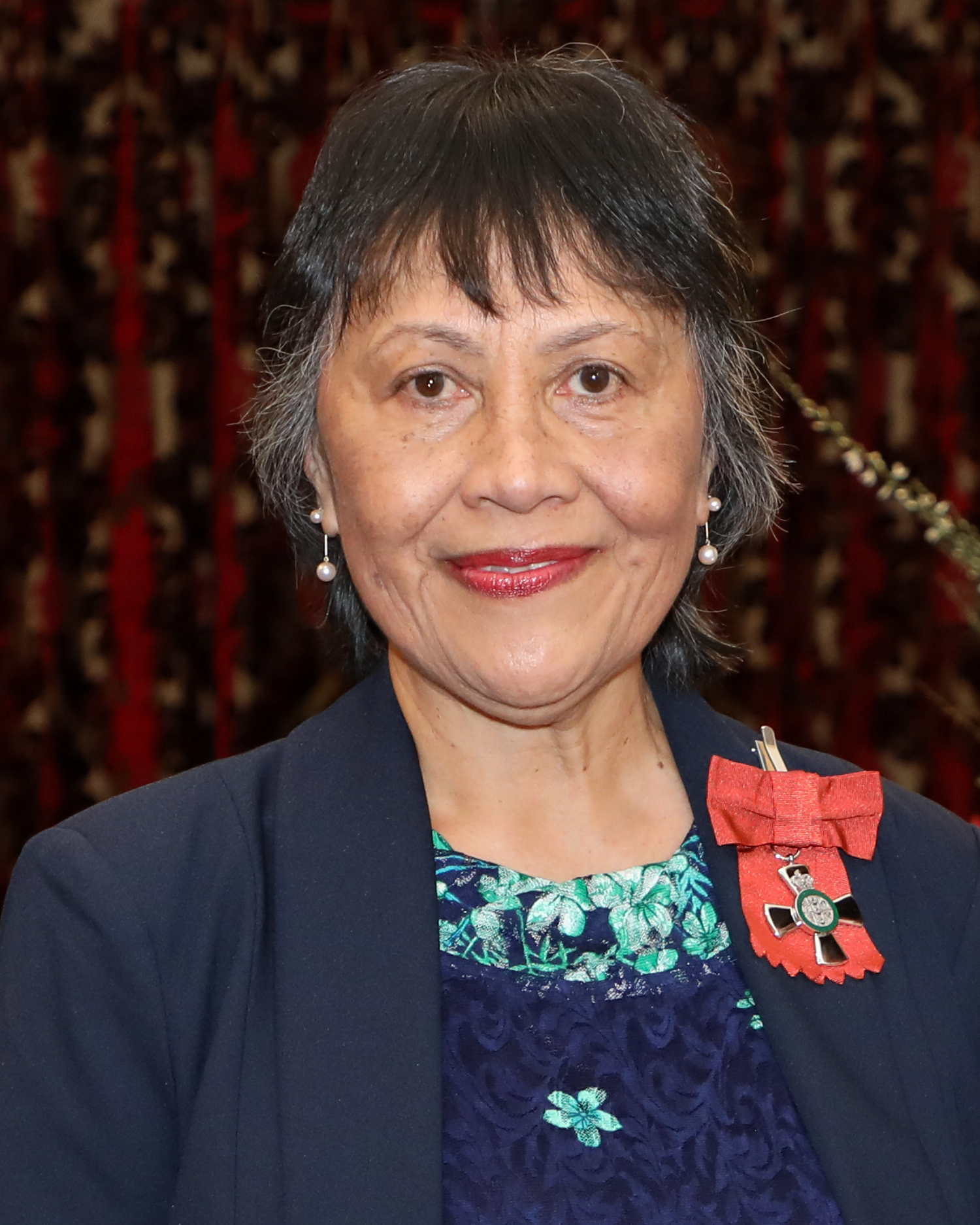
- Dewes in 2023
- Education: University of Auckland
- Awards: Member of the New Zealand Order of Merit
- Scientific career
- Fields: Medical research
- Workplaces: University of Auckland
- Thesis: Obesity Prevention in Pacific Adolescents: Is there a role for the church? (2010)
- Doctoral advisor: Robert Scragg, David R Thomas, Raina Elley

Ofanaite Ana Dewes is a New Zealand academic, and an Associate Investigator at the Maurice Wilkins Centre and a Research Fellow at the University of Auckland, New Zealand.

== Academic career ==
Dewes was born and raised in Suva, Fiji of mixed Rotoman, Tongan, Tuvaluan, and Tokelauan ethnicity, and affiliates to the Māori iwi Ngāti Porou.

She gained a doctoral degree from the University of Auckland with a thesis entitled Obesity Prevention in Pacific Adolescents: Is there a role for the church?; she also has a Master of Business Administration. She later joined the Maurice Wilkins Centre for Molecular Biodiscovery as an Associate Investigator, and is a Research Fellow at the University of Auckland's Centre of Methods and Policy Application in the Social Sciences.

Her research is focussed on the Pasifika community in New Zealand, studying family caring, ageing, chronic diseases such as obesity and Type 2 diabetes, and the role of the church in promoting well-being.

Dewes was appointed a Member of the New Zealand Order of Merit in the 2023 for services to health and the Pacific community.

== Selected works ==
- Taylor, Tamasin Ariana; Beban, Grant; Yi, Elaine; Veukiso, Michael; Sang-Yum, Genevieve; Dewes, Ofa; Wrapson, Wendy; Taufa, Nalei; Campbell, Andrew R. T.; Siegert, Richard J.; Shepherd, Peter (2024). "Empowering Pacific Patients on the Weight Loss Surgery Pathway: A Co-designed Evaluation Study". Obesity Surgery. 34 (3): 959–966. doi:10.1007/s11695-024-07084-w. ISSN 0960-8923. PMC 10899268. PMID 38345730.
- Morgan, Tessa; Wiles, Janine; Park, Hong-Jae; Moeke-Maxwell, Tess; Dewes, Ofa; Black, Stella; Williams, Lisa; Gott, Merryn (2021). "Social connectedness: what matters to older people?". Ageing and Society. 41 (5): 1126–1144. doi:10.1017/S0144686X1900165X. ISSN 0144-686X.
- Dewes, Ofa; Milne, Barry; Sporle, Andrew (31 May 2022). Goodyear-Smith, Felicity (ed.). "Intergenerational, integrative and intellectual Pacific properties and pathways for life (IPforLife): a study protocol". Journal of Primary Health Care. 14 (2): 173–178. doi:10.1071/HC22004. ISSN 1172-6156. PMID 35771695.
- Morgan, Tessa; Wiles, Janine; Park, Hong-Jae; Moeke-Maxwell, Tess; Dewes, Ofa; Black, Stella; Williams, Lisa; Gott, Merryn (2021). "Social connectedness: what matters to older people?". Ageing and Society. 41 (5): 1126–1144. doi:10.1017/S0144686X1900165X. ISSN 0144-686X.
- Morgan, Tessa; Wiles, Janine; Moeke-Maxwell, Tess; Black, Stella; Park, Hong-Jae; Dewes, Ofa; Williams, Lisa Ann; Gott, Merryn (2 October 2020). "'People haven't got that close connection': meanings of loneliness and social isolation to culturally diverse older people". Aging & Mental Health. 24 (10): 1627–1635. doi:10.1080/13607863.2019.1633619. ISSN 1360-7863.
