= Anne-Marie Jackson =

Māori physical education researcher in New Zealand

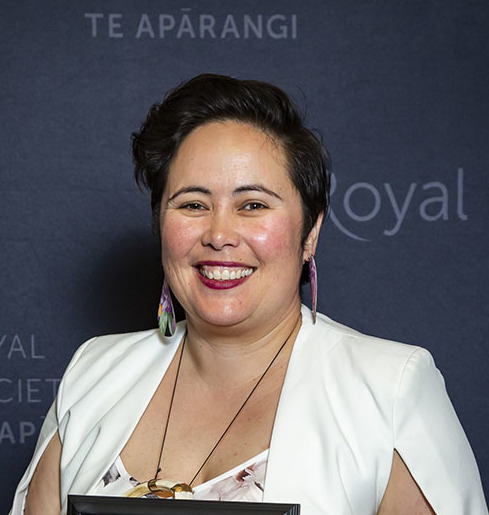
- Anne-Marie Jackson in 2019
- Born: Anne-Marie Jackson

Academic background
- Education: University of Otago
- Thesis: Ki uta ki tai: he taoka tuku iho (2011)
- Doctoral advisor: Tania Cassidy

Anne-Marie Jackson is a New Zealand professor at the University of Otago specialising in Māori physical education and health.

== Early life ==
Jackson grew up in rural Southland, with a Māori and a non-Māori parent. Both her parents worked in shearing gangs. She affiliates with the Ngāti Whātua, Ngāpuhi, Ngāti Kahu o Whangaroa and Ngāti Wai tribes.

She attended boarding school at Southland Girls' High School in Invercargill.

== Academic career ==
Jackson completed a Bachelor of Physical Education Honours degree majoring in exercise sport science and a Master of Physical Education focusing on education policy. She completed a PhD in Māori studies and physical education at the University of Otago in 2011; her thesis was titled Ki uta ki tai: he taoka tuku iho.

In 2011, Jackson was appointed an academic staff member in the University of Otago's School of Physical Education, Sport and Exercise Sciences.

In 2013, she and Hauiti Hakopa, established Te Koronga, a graduate research excellence group which later became recognised as a University of Otago Research Theme: Te Koronga: Indigenous Science.

Jackson also contributes to the Coastal People: Southern Skies collaboration that connects communities with research to rebuild coastal ecosystems.

=== Awards and recognition ===
In 2019, Jackson received the Royal Society Te Apārangi’s Te Kōpūnui Māori Research Award for research creating new knowledge connecting mātauranga Māori (traditional knowledge) and physical sciences.

In 2020, Jackson was the joint winner of the University of Otago Rowheath Trust Award and Carl Smith Medal. The award recognises outstanding research performance of early career staff.

== Selected works ==
- Jackson, Anne-Marie (September 2015). "Kaupapa Māori theory and critical Discourse Analysis: Transformation and social change". AlterNative: An International Journal of Indigenous Peoples. 11 (3): 256–268. doi:10.1177/117718011501100304. ISSN 1177-1801.
