= Louise Parr-Brownlie =

New Zealand neuroscientist

Louise Parr-Brownlie MNZM
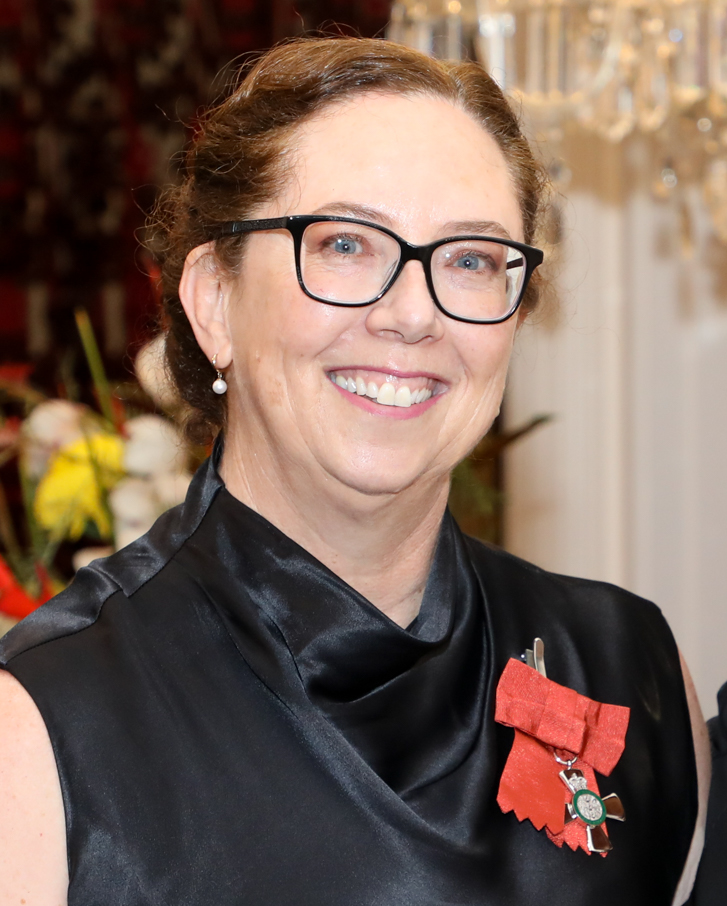
- Parr-Brownlie in 2025
- Born: Auckland

Academic background
- Education: University of Otago

Academic work
- Institutions: University of Otago, MBIE
- Main interests: neurodegenerative disease

Louise Claire Parr-Brownlie MNZM (born 1969) is a New Zealand neuroscientist, and is a professor at the University of Otago, specialising in neurodegenerative diseases and treatment of Parkinson's disease. She was director of the National Science Challenge Ageing Well, Kia eke kairangi ki te taikaumātuatanga from 2020 to 2023.

In 2025, she was appointed a Member of the New Zealand Order of Merit for services to neuroscience.

== Background and education ==
Parr-Brownlie was born in Auckland, and attended Long Bay College. Parr-Brownlie is Maori, and affiliates to the Ngāti Maniapoto and Te Arawa iwi. She attended the University of Otago, completing a Bachelor of Physical Education, then a Master of Science degree in 1999, followed by a PhD in 2003.

== Academic career ==
After her PhD, Parr-Brownlie carried out post-doctoral research at the National Institutes of Health in the United States and, in 2010, joined the faculty of the University of Otago, rising to associate professor in February 2020 and full professor in 2023.

Parr-Brownlie's research seeks to understand the causes of Parkinson's disease, in order to develop treatments. She has studied how changes in individual brain cells and groups of cells can affect movement in the body, and has explored optogenetics, the use of light, to trigger changes in brain cells to try to improve movements in Parkinsonian rats.

Parr-Brownlie joined the Ageing Well National Science Challenge as deputy director in 2018, and then became director in 2020. She was Chair of the organisation Rauika Māngai, which was a collective of leaders of the National Science Challenges and Ngā Pae o te Māramatanga, Aotearoa New Zealand’s Centre of Māori Research Excellence. Parr-Brownlie left the directorship of Ageing Well in 2023 when she was appointed departmental science Advisor to the Ministry of Business, Innovation and Employment. She was also a member of the Brain Research New Zealand Centre of Research Excellence.

Parr-Brownlie is on the board of the Dodd-Walls Centre for Photonic and Quantum Technologies and was a member of the Health Research Council's Biomedical Research Committee from 2021 to 2023. She served as the deputy chairwoman of the Neurological Foundation of New Zealand science advisory committee.

She is the secretary of the International Basal Ganglia Society Council.

== Honours and awards ==
Parr-Brownlie was a finalist in the 2014 Women of Influence Awards in the Innovation and Science category.

In the 2025 New Year Honours, Parr-Brownlie was appointed a Member of the New Zealand Order of Merit for services to neuroscience. In 2025, the Rotary Club of Gore presented Parr-Brownlie with a $10,000 donation towards her research.

== Selected works ==
- Clémentine Bosch; Hyland, Brian Ian; Parr, Louise Claire (2013). "Motor thalamus integration of cortical, cerebellar and basal ganglia information: implications for normal and parkinsonian conditions". Frontiers in Computational Neuroscience. 7: 163. doi:10.3389/fncom.2013.00163. PMC 3822295. PMID 24273509. Wikidata Q28302667.
- Avila, Irene; Parr, Louise Claire; Brazhnik, Elena; Castañeda, Edward; Bergstrom, Debra; Richmond, Judith (2009). "Beta frequency synchronization in basal ganglia output during rest and walk in a hemiparkinsonian rat". Experimental Neurology. 221 (2): 307–319. doi:10.1016/j.expneurol.2009.11.016. PMC 3384738. PMID 19948166. Wikidata Q36062933.
- Richmond, Judith; Hu, D; Itoga, C A; Parr, Louise Claire; Bergstrom, Debra (2006). "Phase relationships support a role for coordinated activity in the indirect pathway in organizing slow oscillations in basal ganglia output after loss of dopamine". Neuroscience. 144 (2): 762–776. doi:10.1016/j.neuroscience.2006.10.006. PMC 3354994. PMID 17112675. Wikidata Q35968238.
- Parr, Louise Claire; Clémentine Bosch; Schweitzer, Lucia; Sizemore, Rachel; Abraham, Wickliffe Carson; Hughes, Stephanie Margaret (2015). "Lentiviral vectors as tools to understand central nervous system biology in mammalian model organisms". Frontiers in Molecular Neuroscience. 8: 14. doi:10.3389/fnmol.2015.00014. PMC 4434958. PMID 26041987. Wikidata Q38515294.
