= Debra Waters =

New Zealand exercise physiologist and health ageing researcher

- Other names: Debra Lynn Waters
- Scientific career
- Fields: Healthy ageing, sarcopenia
- Institutions: University of New Mexico; University of Otago

Debra Lynn Waters is a New Zealand exercise physiologist and medical researcher in the field of health ageing, director of Gerontology Research and professor at the University of Otago.

== Academic career ==
With a BS and PhD, exercise physiologist Waters moved from the University of New Mexico, where she retains the role of adjunct professor, to the University of Otago in New Zealand in 2005. In December 2019 Waters was promoted to full professor at the University of Otago with effect from 1 February 2020.

Waters has led research into falls prevention through the Steady As You Go programme since 2010. Early in 2019 Waters and Louise Parr-Brownlie were appointed joint directors of New Zealand's Ageing Well National Science Challenge. The programme conducts research into health ageing, including ageing and Māori and researchers in universities across New Zealand participate.

Waters became editor-in-chief of the Australasian Journal on Ageing in January 2021. She is on the editorial board of The Journal of Frailty & Aging and an editor of Annals of Geriatric Medicine and Research.

== Selected works ==
- Claire Freeman; Debra L Waters; Yvette Buttery; Yolanda van Heezik (25 January 2019). "The impacts of ageing on connection to nature: the varied responses of older adults". Health & Place. 56: 24–33. doi:10.1016/J.HEALTHPLACE.2019.01.010. ISSN 1353-8292. PMID 30690279. Wikidata Q91251743.
- Lara Vlietstra; Simon Stebbings; Kim Meredith-Jones; John Haxby Abbott; Gareth Treharne; Debra L Waters (6 June 2019). "Sarcopenia in osteoarthritis and rheumatoid arthritis: The association with self-reported fatigue, physical function and obesity". PLOS One. 14 (6): e0217462. doi:10.1371/JOURNAL.PONE.0217462. ISSN 1932-6203. PMC 6553728. PMID 31170172. Wikidata Q92562240.
- Sarah Rhodes; Debra Waters; Ben Brockway; Margot Skinner (1 September 2020). "Physical activity behaviour and barriers to activity in adults at high risk of obstructive sleep apnoea". Journal of Primary Health Care. 12 (3): 257–264. doi:10.1071/HC19102. ISSN 1172-6156. PMID 32988447. Wikidata Q100314581.
- Lara Vlietstra; Debra Waters; Lynnette Jones; Kim Meredith-Jones (16 October 2020). "High-Intensity Interval Aerobic Resistance Training to Counteract Low Relative Appendicular Lean Soft Tissue Mass in Middle Age: Study Protocol for a Randomized Controlled Trial". JMIR Research Protocols. 9 (10): e22989. doi:10.2196/22989. ISSN 1929-0748. PMID 33064101. Wikidata Q100672972.
