= Nancy Longnecker =

New Zealand based science communication academic

Nancy Ellen Longnecker
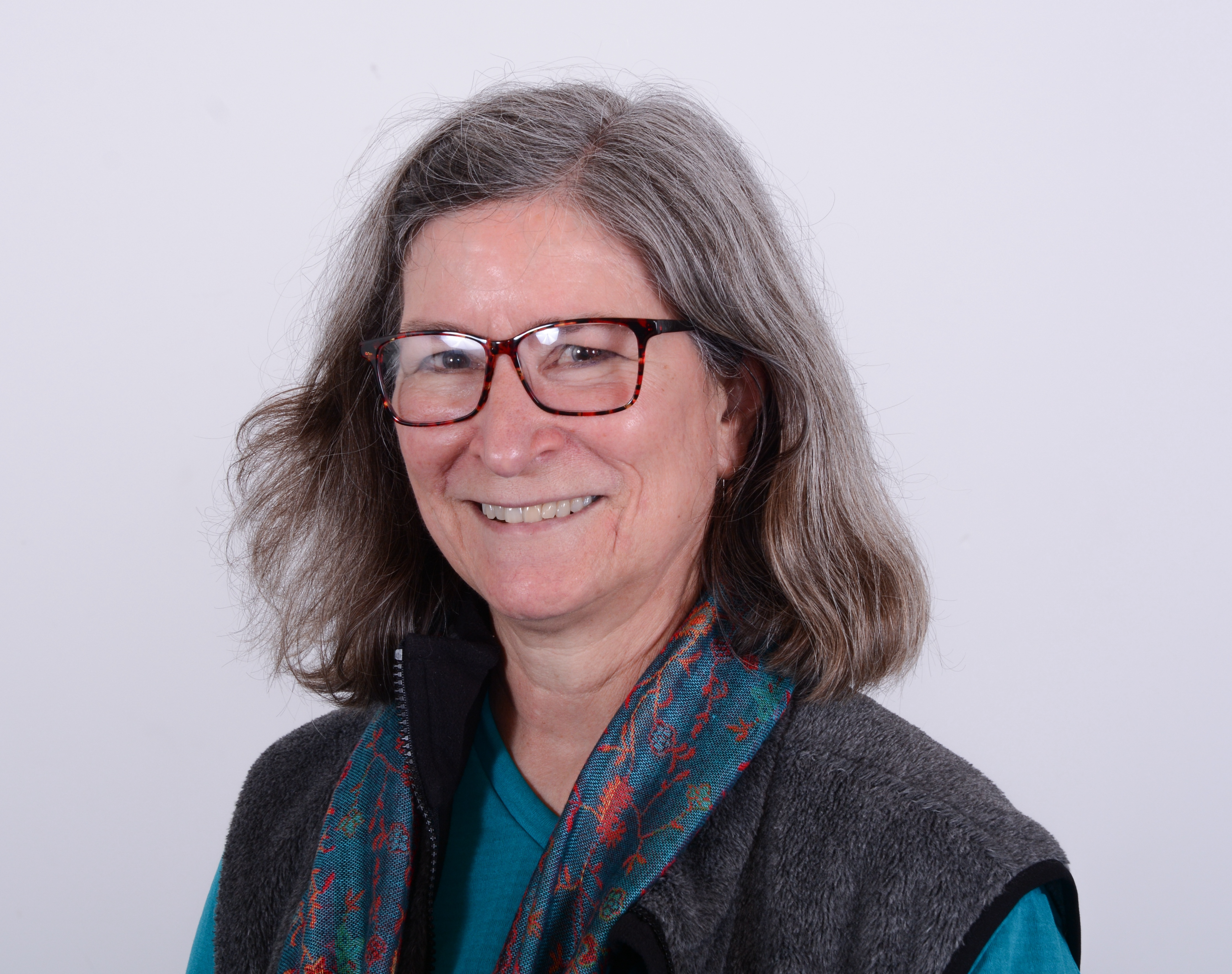
- At Ageing Well 2020 Symposium
- Education: Cornell University
- Scientific career
- Fields: Agronomy, science communication
- Workplaces: University of Western Australia, University of Otago
- Thesis: A comparison of the resistance of soybean and sunflower to iron-deficiency induced chlorosis (1986)

Nancy Ellen Longnecker is a New Zealand based science communication academic. She is currently professor of science communication at the University of Otago.

== Academic career ==
Longnecker's early work focused on nutritional efficiency in agricultural plants. Her 1980 MSc titled 'Factors affecting iron uptake by iron-efficient and inefficient soybean varieties' and a 1986 PhD titled 'A comparison of the resistance of soybean and sunflower to iron-deficiency induced chlorosis' were both obtained through study at Cornell University under supervision by Ross M. Welch. She moved to Australia in 1986 to take up a postdoctoral position at the University of Adelaide on manganese efficiency of barley. She then moved to the University of Western Australia in 1988 to work on phosphorus uptake in barley with Prof Alan Robson and settled in Perth for the next 26 years.

From 1994 until 2002 Nancy was Education Programme Manager and then Communication Manager at CLIMA, a cooperative research centre based in Perth, Western Australia. A CLIMA team of educators produced 'The Bean Files' in the early days of the web. The Bean Files was an online resource for primary school students which followed farm activities in a series of episodes throughout a growing season. It was narrated by Billie Bean and populated with a cast of characters including Chelsea Chickpea, Lentils in Leotards, roving underground reporter Albert Annelid, and Spike Medic. The Bean Files was a collaborative effort of CLIMA staff and postgraduate students who met weekly during their lunch break. The series was created to let urban kids know more about how their food was produced.

Another product from the CLIMA Education programme was Passion for Pulses. The cookbook contains recipes provided by people throughout the food chain, from agricultural researchers, farmers, agricultural industry and chefs. It was illustrated by the photographer Brad Rimmer. As with the Bean Files, the purpose of this resource was to give urban populations a better ides of the scientific research and other work behind food production.

Her work at CLIMA gave Longnecker a taste for science communication and from 2002, she was instrumental in setting up an academic science communication programme at the University of Western Australia. She developed and delivered curriculum for an undergraduate minor and postgraduate courses, teaching in both Perth and Singapore. She also built a science communication research group which examined impact of participation in science outreach, informal science education and citizen science, methods of teaching science communication and impact of communication on public attitudes and policy. Objectives of the research included improving effectiveness of science outreach and education experiences.

In 2014, Nancy moved to the University of Otago in Dunedin, New Zealand as Professor of Science Communication. She teaches a class on science exhibitions and interpretation. She and her students from UWA and Otago have produced exhibitions that have been seen by thousands of visitors. Her current research programme aims to develop an evidence base to determine impact and effectiveness of citizen science programs and other science engagement initiatives. She and her research group examine factors that affect peoples’ attitudes towards science-related issues. They also examine how information can be used to change attitudes and behaviour while respecting values and different sources of knowledge. Most of her group’s research relates to learning or practicing science outside of formal educational settings.

== Selected works ==
- Longnecker, N. (2016). An integrated model of science communication – More than providing evidence. Journal of Science Communication. 15(05). 1-13.
- Liberatore, A., Bowkett, E., MacLeod, C., Spurr, E. and Longnecker, N. (2018). Social Media as a Platform a Citizen Science Community of Practice. Citizen Science: Theory and Practice. 3(1): 3, pp. 1–14. DOI: 10.5334/cstp.108
- Ha, Jennifer Fong, and Nancy Longnecker. "Doctor-patient communication: a review." The Ochsner Journal 10, no. 1 (2010): 38-43.
- Longnecker, Nancy, E. J. M. Kirby, and Alan Robson. "Leaf emergence, tiller growth, and apical development of nitrogen-dificient spring wheat." Crop Science 33, no. 1 (1993): 154-160.
- Longnecker, Nancy E., and Alan D. Robson. "Distribution and transport of zinc in plants." In Zinc in soils and plants, pp. 79–91. Springer, Dordrecht, 1993.
- Longnecker, Nancy, and Ross M. Welch. "Accumulation of apoplastic iron in plant roots: a factor in the resistance of soybeans to iron-deficiency induced chlorosis?." Plant physiology 92, no. 1 (1990): 17-22.
- Mulder, Henk AJ, Nancy Longnecker, and Lloyd S. Davis. "The state of science communication programs at universities around the world." Science Communication 30, no. 2 (2008): 277-287.
