= Adrienne von Tunzelmann =

New Zealand business executive

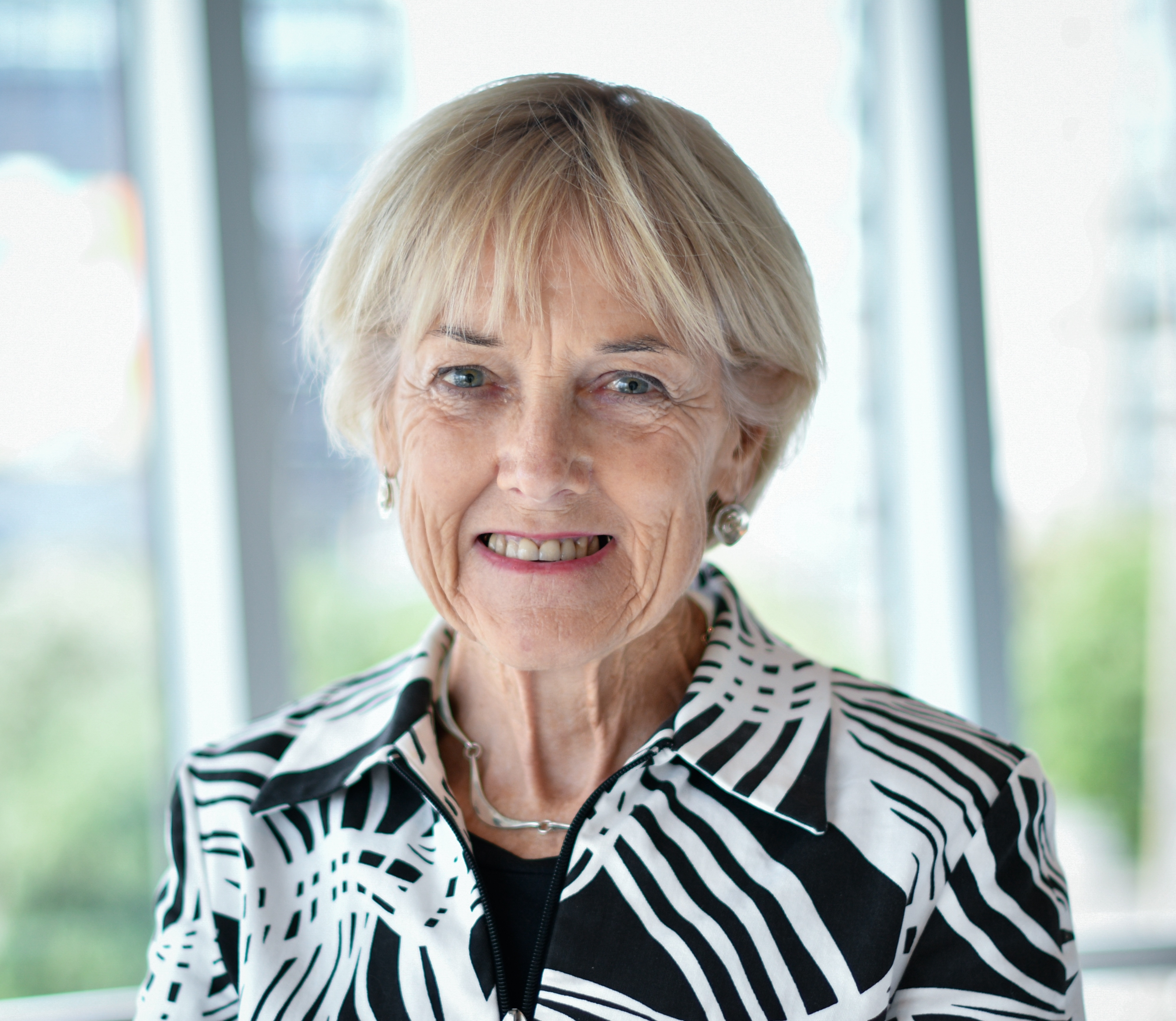
Von Tunzelmann at the Ageing Well final symposium, April 2024

Adrienne Fay von Tunzelmann QSO (born c. 1947) is an executive director from New Zealand.

== Biography ==
Von Tunzelmann was raised in Christchurch, Lyall Bay in Wellington, and in Fiji where her Air Force father was posted. She graduated from the University of Canterbury in the late 1960s with a First-Class Honours degree in economics. After graduating and teaching for a year as a junior lecturer in economics, she moved to Wellington. Her first job offer was at a major bank, on a lower salary scale reserved for women. She declined the offer and instead joined the New Zealand Treasury, which offered equal pay for male and female staff. She worked in Parliament and Treasury as a branch manager until 1990, then moved to work at the Department of Justice as Deputy Chief Executive where she was responsible for the Office of Treaty Settlements. In 1985, von Tunzelmann was the first woman to become Deputy Clerk of the House of Representatives, and was also Head of the Select Committee Office. While working, she completed a Master of Public Policy (with Distinction) at Victoria University of Wellington. She has a Certificate in Company Directorship, graduated from the MIT Sloan School of Management, and is a Distinguished Fellow of the Institute of Directors.

In 2001, von Tunzelmann moved to Tauranga and set up a private consultancy business.

She served for 14 years on the governing body of Te Whare Wānanga o Awanuiārangi, a Ngāti Awa tertiary education organisation for Māori in the eastern Bay of Plenty. She has also served on the board of Pharmac, Ageing Well National Science Challenge, and Osteoporosis New Zealand, and was chair of the board of Bone Health New Zealand. She has been the chairperson of the New Zealand Women's Refuge Foundation, vice president of Age Concern New Zealand, and a patron of the Tauranga Community Housing Trust, which provides housing for people with disabilities. She has also served as president of the Tauranga Chamber of Commerce and the New Zealand Institute for Public Administration.

=== Personal life ===
Von Tunzelmann is married to Peter McKinlay. She is the great-grandniece of pioneer explorer Nicholas von Tunzelmann.

== Honours and awards ==
In 1977, von Tunzelmann received the Queen Elizabeth II Silver Jubilee Medal, and in 1993, she was awarded the New Zealand Suffrage Centennial Medal. In the 2016 Birthday Honours, she was appointed a Companion of the Queen's Service Order, for services to governance and the community. In 2024 she received a Distinguished Fellowship in Education from Te Whāre Wānanga o Awanuiārangi.

== Publications ==
- Von Tunzelmann, Adrienne (1996). Social responsibility and the company: a new perspective on governance, strategy and the community. Wellington: Institute of Policy Studies, Victoria University of Wellington. ISBN 978-0-908935-14-7.
