= Judith R. Walters =

American neuropharmacologist

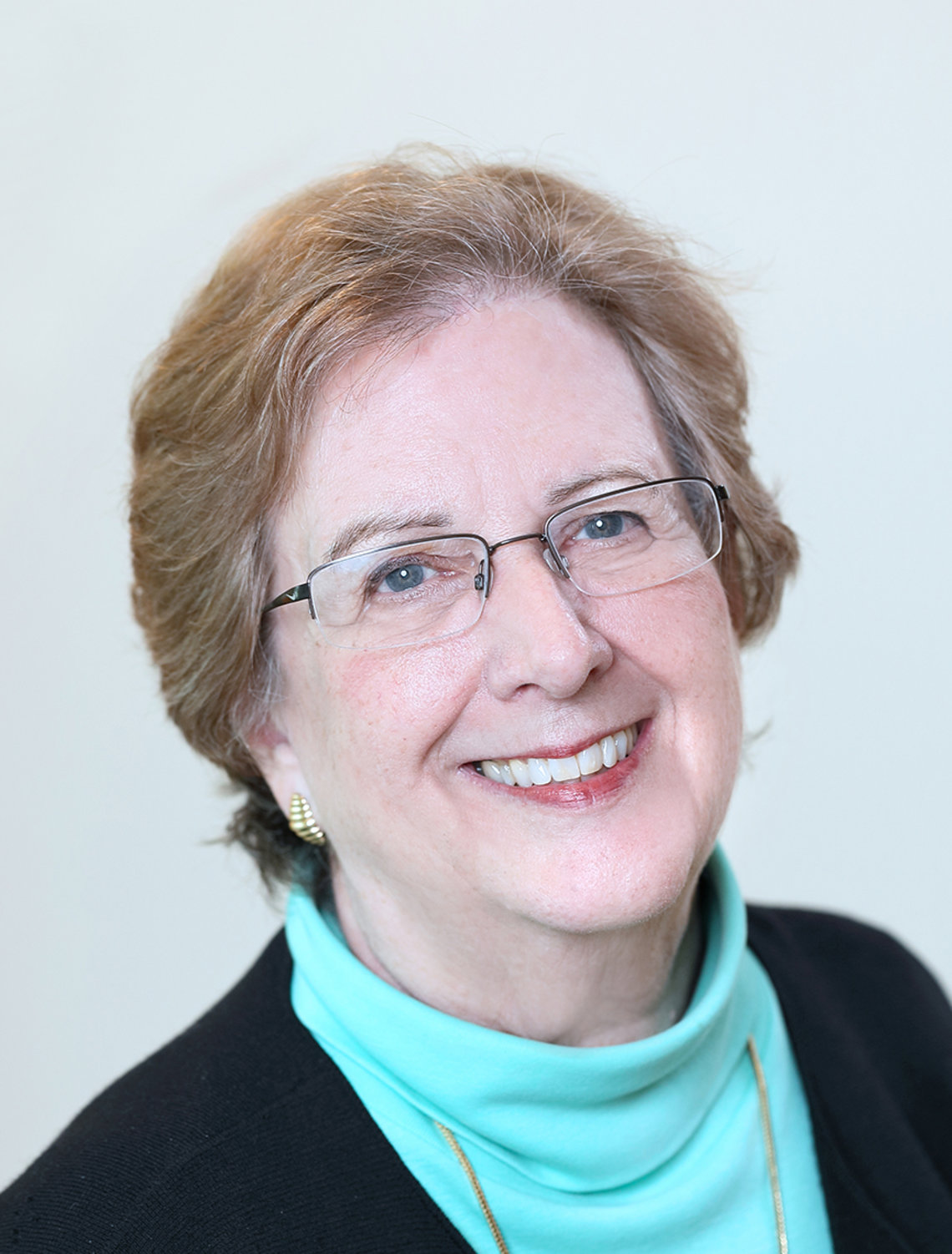
- Walters in 2018
- Education: Mount Holyoke College; Yale University
- Scientific career
- Fields: Neurophysiological pharmacology
- Workplaces: National Institute of Neurological Disorders and Stroke
- Doctoral advisor: Robert Henry Roth

Judith Richmond Walters is an American neuropharmacologist serving as chief of the neurophysiological pharmacology section at the National Institute of Neurological Disorders and Stroke.

== Life ==
Walters received her B.A. degree from Mount Holyoke College and her Ph.D. from Yale University. Her 1972 dissertation was titled Dopaminergic Neurons: Effect of Gamma-Hydroxybutyrate. She studied the pharmacology and neurophysiology of the dopamine system in the basal ganglia. Her doctoral advisor was Robert Henry Roth. Walters did postdoctoral work at the department of psychiatry at the Yale University School of Medicine and then moved to the Experimental Therapeutics Branch in the National Institute of Neurological Disorders and Stroke (NINDS).

Walters is a neuropharmacologist working as chief of the Neurophysiological Pharmacology Section at the NINDS. Her laboratory explores the role of dopamine in basal ganglia-thalamocortical function. She studies the mechanisms in the brain that mediate dysfunctions associated with neurological diseases and disorders such as Parkinson’s disease. She became a Fellow of the American Association for the Advancement of Science in 2018.
