= Landscape and Urban Planning =

- Discipline: Landscape science, planning and design
- Language: English
- Edited by: Joan I. Nassauer, Peter H. Verburg

Publication details
- Former names: Landscape Planning; Urban Ecology
- History: 1974–present
- Publisher: Elsevier
- Frequency: Monthly
- Open access: Hybrid
- License: CC BY and CC BY-NC-ND
- Impact factor: 9.1 (2022)

Standard abbreviations
- ISO 4: Landsc. Urban Plan.

Indexing
- ISSN: 0169-2046
- LCCN: 92643989
- OCLC no.: 643914016

Links
- Journal homepage; Online archive

Landscape and Urban Planning is a monthly peer-reviewed academic journal published by Elsevier. It covers landscape science (including landscape planning, design, and architecture), urban and regional planning, landscape and ecological engineering, landscape and urban ecology, and other practice-oriented fields. The editors-in-chief is Joan I. Nassauer (University of Michigan) and Peter H. Verburg (Vrije Universiteit Amsterdam).

== History ==
The journal was established in 1974 by Elsevier as Landscape Planning under founding editor-in-chief Arnold E. Weddle. In 1986, the journal was renamed and merged with the journal Urban Ecology. In 1988, the journal also incorporated Reclamation and Revegetation Research.

== Editors-in-chief ==
=== Landscape and Urban Planning ===
The following persons are or have been editor-in-chief of Landscape and Urban Planning:

Name	Affiliation	Start date	End date
Puay Yok Tan	National University of Singapore	June 2021	(present)
Peter H. Verburg	Vrije Universiteit Amsterdam	October 2018	May 2024
Joan I. Nassauer	University of Michigan	June 2014	2021
Wei-Ning Xiang	Tongji University	November 2011	October 2018
Paul H. Gobster	United States Forest Service)	October 2010	June 2014
Jon E. Rodiek	Texas A&M University	1991	September 2010
Michael M. McCarthy	Texas A&M University	1991	1992
Arnold E. Weddle	University of Sheffield	1974	1990

=== Urban Ecology ===
The following persons have been editor-in-chief of Urban Ecology:

- Amos Rapoport (University of Wisconsin–Milwaukee): April 1981–1986
- Royce LaNier (University of Wisconsin–Milwaukee): 1975–March 1981

=== Reclamation and Revegetation Research ===
The following persons have been editor-in-chief of Reclamation and Revegetation Research:

- Mohan K. Wali (University of North Dakota): 1982–1988
- Edward M. Watkin (Mine Waste Reclamation, Guelph, Ontario): 1983–1988

== Abstracting and indexing ==
The journal is abstracted and indexed in:

- BIOSIS Previews
- Cambridge Scientific Abstracts
- Current Contents/Agriculture, Biology & Environmental Sciences
- Current Contents/Social & Behavioral Sciences
- GEOBASE
- Science Citation Index Expanded
- Social Sciences Citation Index
- Scopus
- Urban Studies Abstracts
- The Zoological Record

According to the Journal Citation Reports, the journal has a 2022 impact factor of 9.1.
