= Tokelauans =

Indigenous Polynesian people of Tokelau

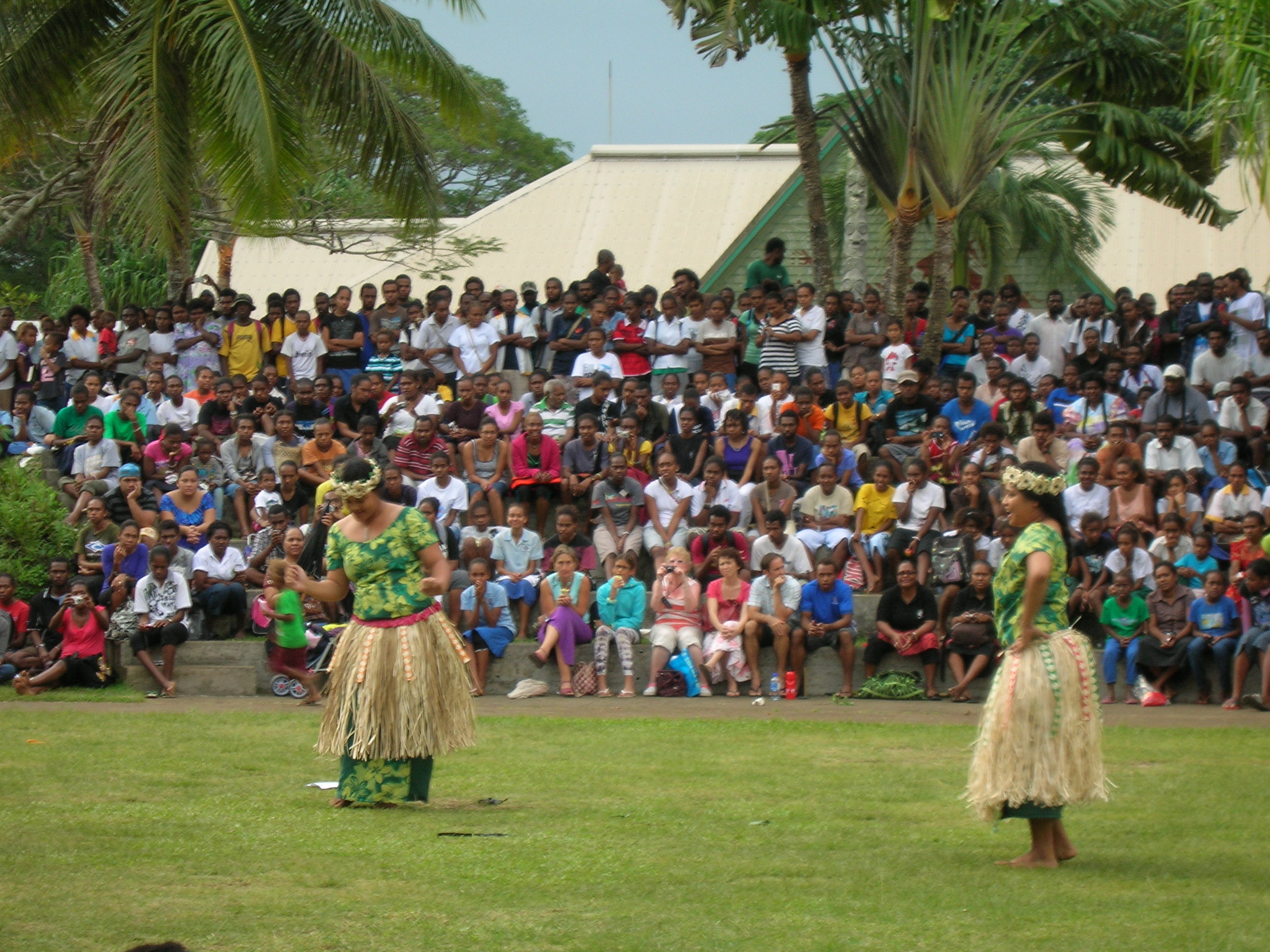
- Tokelauan dancers

Total population
- c. 10,000

Regions with significant populations
- Tokelau New Zealand Samoa Hawaii (United States)

Languages
- Tokelauan, English

Religion
- Congregationalism, Roman Catholic

Related ethnic groups
- Other Polynesians

The Tokelauans are a Polynesian ethnic group native to Tokelau, a Polynesian archipelago in the Pacific Ocean, who share the Tokelauan Polynesian culture, history and language.

The group's home islands are a dependent territory of New Zealand. 77% of Tokelau's population of 1,650 claims Tokelauan ancestry, while 9,822 Tokelauans live in New Zealand. A small number also live in Samoa.

== Language ==
The Tokelauan language is part of the Polynesian language family. Most Tokelauans are fluent in both English and Tokelauan. There are approximately 4,000 speakers, the majority of whom live in New Zealand.

== Diaspora ==
The majority of Tokelauans live in New Zealand, concentrated in the Hutt Valley and Porirua, as well as Auckland. They are the sixth largest Pacific Islander ethnic group in New Zealand, and one of the most socio-economically deprived. Migration to New Zealand began in the 1950s and increased in the 1960s under a government resettlement scheme driven by fears of overpopulation and a tropical cyclone striking the islands. The New Zealand-based population exceeded that of Tokelau in 1976, and immigration declined after that point.

== Culture ==
=== Religion ===
As of 2019, 50.4% of Tokelauan people belong to the Congregational Christian Church while 38.7% belong to the Catholic Church. The rest of the population adheres to various Christian denominations, such as Presbyterianism. Roman Catholicism is mostly practiced in Nukunonu, whereas inhabitants of the islands of Atafu and Fakaofo adhere to Congregationalism. Prior to the arrival of Christianity, Tokelauans worshiped a god named Tui Tokelau.

=== Sports ===
Netball, rugby, football and cricket are popular in Tokelau. Tokelau Games are held yearly.
