= Health & Place =

- Discipline: Health geography
- Language: English
- Edited by: Valorie Crooks, Michael J. Widener

Publication details
- History: 1995-present
- Publisher: Elsevier
- Frequency: Bimonthly
- Impact factor: 4.8 (2022)

Standard abbreviations
- ISO 4: Health Place

Indexing
- ISSN: 1353-8292 (print); 1873-2054 (web)
- LCCN: sn95001783
- OCLC no.: 222760083

Links
- Journal homepage; Online archive

Health & Place is a bimonthly peer-reviewed public health journal covering research on the relationship between geographic location and health. It was established in 1995 and is published by Elsevier. The co-editors-in-chief are Valorie Crooks (Simon Fraser University) and Michael J. Widener (University of Toronto).

== Editors-in-chief ==
The following persons are or have been editor-in-chief:

- 2024–present: Valorie Crooks (Simon Fraser University) and Michael J. Widener (University of Toronto)
- 2014–2024: Jamie Pearce (University of Edinburgh)
- 1995–2014: Graham Moon (founding editor; University of Southampton)

== Abstracting and indexing ==
The journal is abstracted and indexed in CINAHL, Current Contents/Social & Behavioral Sciences, MEDLINE/PubMed, Embase, GEOBASE, Social Sciences Citation Index, PsycINFO, and Scopus. According to the Journal Citation Reports, the journal has a 2022 impact factor of 4.8.
