= Claire Freeman =

New Zealand professor

- Education: Leeds Metropolitan University (PhD); University of the Witwatersrand (MA); Rhodes University (BA)
- Scientific career
- Fields: Environmental planning
- Workplaces: Victoria University of Wellington

Claire Freeman is a New Zealand urban geography and environmental planning professor.

== Education and career ==
After a PhD at Leeds Metropolitan University, Freeman worked at University of the North West, Leeds Metropolitan University and Massey University before moving to Otago University in 1999, where she was a full professor from 2015 to 2023. In 2023, she became a professor at Victoria University of Wellington.

== Selected works ==
- Mathieu, Renaud, Claire Freeman, and Jagannath Aryal. "Mapping private gardens in urban areas using object-oriented techniques and very high-resolution satellite imagery." Landscape and Urban Planning vol. 81, no. 3 (2007): 179–192.
- Freeman, Claire. "Local government and emerging models of participation in the Local Agenda 21 process." Journal of Environmental Planning and Management vol. 39, no. 1 (1996): 65–78.
- Freeman, Claire, and Paul J. Tranter. Children and their urban environment: Changing worlds. Routledge, 2011.
- Freeman, Claire, and Oliver Buck. "Development of an ecological mapping methodology for urban areas in New Zealand." Landscape and Urban Planning vol. 63, no. 3 (2003): 161–173.
