= Faʻafetai Sopoaga =

Samoan-New Zealand academic

Faʻafetai Sopoaga CNZM
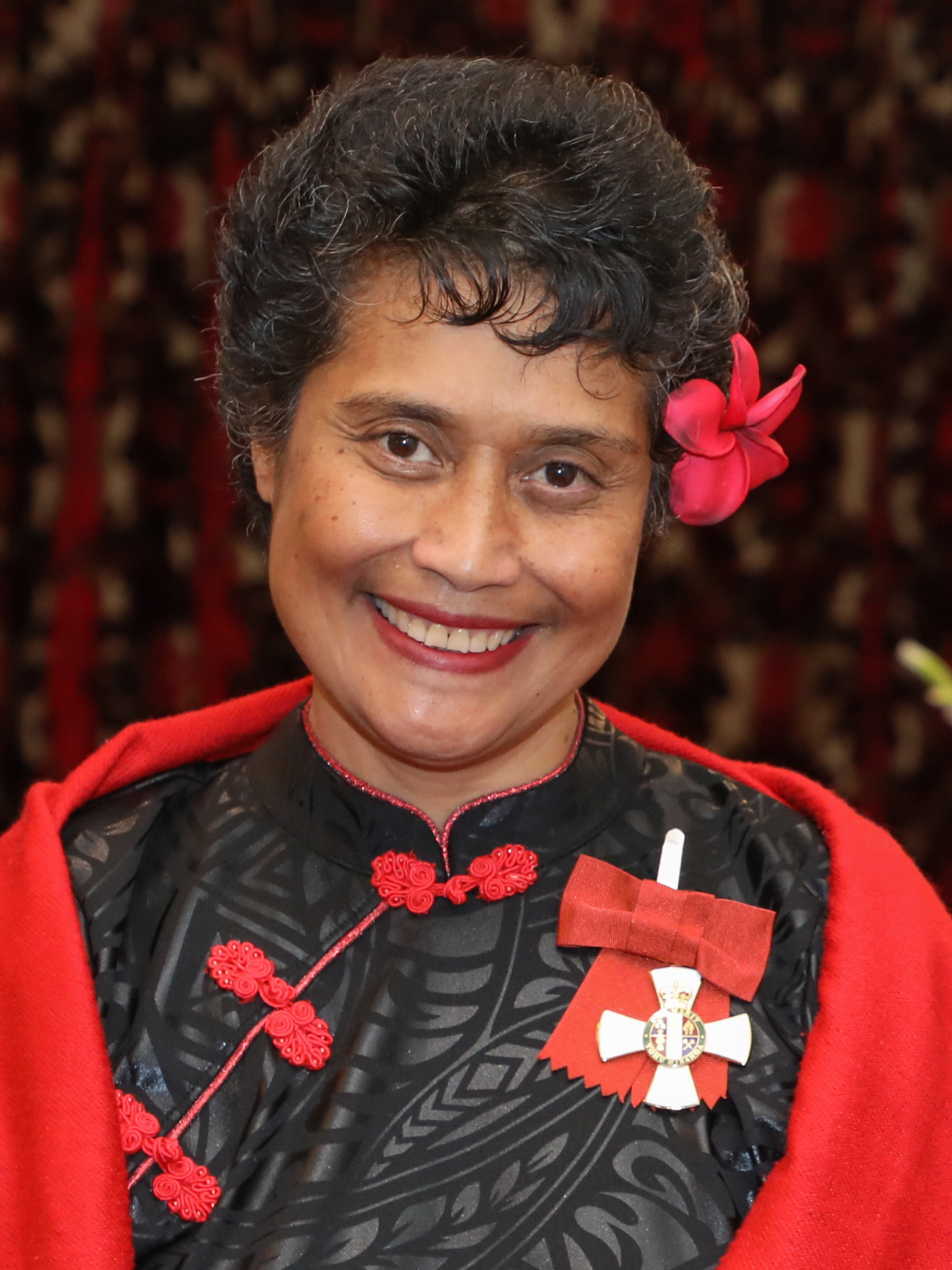
- Sopoaga in 2022
- Born: Samoa
- Education: University of Otago
- Scientific career
- Workplaces: University of Otago
- Thesis: "Folauga" - Pacific health, well-being and success in higher education (2021)

Faumuinā Faʻafetai Sopoaga CNZM is a Samoan-New Zealand academic specialising in Pacific health, Pacific workforce development, Pacific students, and Pacific communities. She is a professor at the Dunedin School of Medicine at the University of Otago, Dunedin. When she was appointed, she became the first Pacific woman medical doctor to be appointed in a professorial role at any university in Australia or New Zealand, and the first Pacific woman to be appointed a professor at the University of Otago.

== Biography ==
Sopoaga is from Fagaloa in Samoa. Her parents, Nomeneta and Lili Sopoaga, were church ministers. In 1984, Sopoaga studied on a government scholarship at Timaru Girls' High School, and then moved to Dunedin to study medicine. She intended to return to Samoa after completing her studies, however due to an underlying health issue, Sopoaga was advised to reside in New Zealand permanently rather than return to Samoa. She completed a PhD in 2021 with a thesis titled "Folauga" - Pacific health, well-being and success in higher education.

Sopoaga serves as Health Advisor for the New Zealand High Commission in Samoa and has assisted in the establishment of a medical school, based at the National University of Samoa.

=== Recognition ===
In 2018, Sopoaga received a Tertiary Teaching Excellence Award from Ako Aotearoa for "sustained excellence in tertiary teaching and endorsement for excellence in supporting Pacific learners"; she also received the Prime Minister's Supreme Award for Tertiary Teaching Excellence.

In the 2022 New Year Honours, Sopoaga was appointed a Companion of the New Zealand Order of Merit, for services to Pacific health and tertiary education.
