= Philippa Howden-Chapman =

New Zealand public health researcher

Philippa Howden-Chapman CNZM QSO
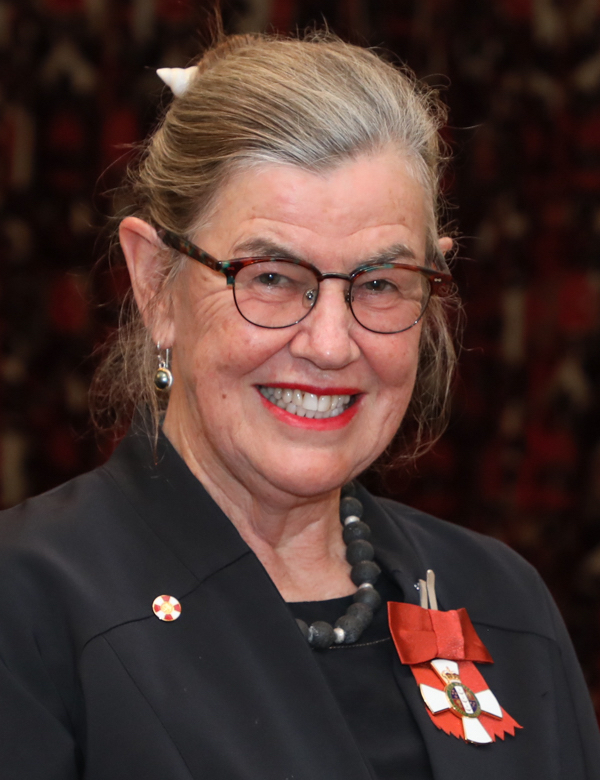
- Howden-Chapman in 2021
- Born: Auckland, New Zealand
- Education: University of Auckland
- Known for: Research into housing insulation and heating in New Zealand
- Spouse: Ralph Chapman
- Children: 3
- Awards: Public Health Champion 2006; Joan Metge medal Liley medal Prime Minister's Science Prize
- Scientific career
- Fields: Public health, housing, social housing, health inequality, fuel poverty
- Workplaces: University of Otago, Wellington
- Website: Staff page Alternative staff page Google Scholar page

Philippa Lynne Howden-Chapman CNZM QSO is a professor of public health at the University of Otago, Wellington, and the director of the New Zealand Centre for Sustainable Cities.

== Education ==
Howden-Chapman studied at the University of Auckland and was awarded a PhD in 1987. Her doctoral thesis was titled An evaluation of three treatment programmes for alcoholism: an experimental study with six- and eighteen-month follow-ups.

== Career ==
Howden-Chapman started her career in secondary-school teaching, before moving to clinical psychology, and then public health.

She has conducted a number of high-profile randomised control trials into various aspects of housing and health, in the process helping to build the evidence base for the later New Zealand-wide insulation programme. Howden-Chapman's Healthy Housing group conducted an analysis of the Warm Up New Zealand: Heat Smart programme which showed that overall it "will have a net benefit of $951 million dollars, and a highly favourable benefit cost ratio of 3.9:1."

Howden-Chapman was a member of the 2012 Expert Advisory Group on Solutions to Child Poverty, which outlined a number of policy recommendations to tackle child poverty in New Zealand.

In December 2014, Howden-Chapman and her research programme were awarded the $500,000 Prime Minister's Science Prize. She was the first woman and the first social scientist to win the prize.

Howden-Chapman is the chair of the WHO Housing and Health Guideline Development Group. She is also director of He Kāinga Orana, the Housing and Health Research Programme examining the link between housing quality and health, based in the University of Otago, New Zealand. With a strong interest in reducing inequalities in the determinants of health, Howden-Chapman's research aims to identify and evaluate housing-related interventions to improve individual, family and community health. Her research has had a major influence on housing, health and energy policy in New Zealand.

== Recognition ==
In the 2009 New Year Honours, Howden-Chapman was appointed a Companion of the Queen's Service Order, for services to public health.

In November 2013, Howden-Chapman was made a fellow of the Royal Society of New Zealand.

In 2017, Howden was selected as one of the Royal Society Te Apārangi's "150 women in 150 words", celebrating the contributions of women to knowledge in New Zealand.

Howden-Chapman was named the Supreme Winner of NEXT Woman of the Year 2018 for her advocacy for healthy, warm and dry homes in New Zealand.

In October 2019, Howden-Chapman was appointed one of seven inaugural sesquicentennial distinguished chairs, or poutoko taiea, at Otago University.

In the 2021 New Year Honours, Howden-Chapman was appointed a Companion of the New Zealand Order of Merit, for services to public health. She was awarded the 2021 Rutherford Medal for her healthy housing research.

== Selected publications ==
- Howden-Chapman, P. & Penelope Carroll (eds.) (2004). Housing and Health. Steele Roberts. ISBN 1-877338-17-6
- Howden-Chapman, P., Stuart, K. & Chapman, R. (eds.) (2010). Sizing up the City: Urban Form and Transport in New Zealand. Steele Roberts. ISBN 9781877448904
- Bierre, S., Philippa Howden-Chapman & Lisa Early (eds.) (2013). Homes People Can Afford: How to Improve Housing in New Zealand. Steele Roberts. ISBN 978-1-927242-25-4
- Howden-Chapman, P. (2015). Home truths: Confronting New Zealand's housing crisis. Wellington, New Zealand: Bridget Williams Books, 116p. doi: 10.7810/9780947492335
- Howden-Chapman, P. & Chapman, R. Risk, uncertainty and post-normal science: towards better policy. New Zealand Science Review, 1998, 55, 1–2, 11–19.
