= Liz Smythe =

New Zealand emeritus professor of nursing and midwifery

- Other name: Elizabeth C. Smythe

Academic background
- Education: Massey University
- Thesis: Being safe in childbirth: a hermeneutic interpretation of the narratives of women and practitioners (1998)
- Doctoral advisor: Cheryl Benn, Valerie Fleming

Academic work
- Institutions: Auckland University of Technology
- Doctoral students: Susan Crowther, Judith McAra-Couper, Valerie Wright-St Clair
- Notable students: Joyce Cowan, Louise Rummel

Elizabeth C. Smythe is a New Zealand midwifery and nursing academic, and is an emeritus professor at the Auckland University of Technology. Smythe's research focuses on hermeneutic phenomenology, which is the study of interpretive structures of experience, to improve healthcare experiences and clinical practice. Smythe led the introduction of the Doctor of Health Science programme at the university. She retired in 2022.

== Academic career ==
Smythe trained as a nurse and a midwife, and then in 1998 completed a PhD titled Being safe in childbirth: a hermeneutic interpretation of the narratives of women and practitioners at Massey University, supervised by Cheryl Benn and Valerie Fleming. Smythe joined the faculty of the School of Clinical Sciences at Auckland University of Technology, rising to full professor in 2013.

Smythe's research focuses on using hermeneutic phenomenology to improve healthcare experiences. Smythe led the introduction of the midwifery degree in 1987, and the development of the Doctor of Health Science programme, a professional doctorate unique in New Zealand focused on changing clinical practice. The doctorate was established in 2003, and became the "largest health professional doctorate in Australasia" by 2020, and had more than a hundred enrolled students by 2022. Notable students of Smythe include Joyce Cowan; notable doctoral students include Susan Crowther, Judith McAra-Couper, Louise Rummel and Valerie Wright-St Clair.

Smythe was appointed emeritus professor in 2022, having retired from her position earlier that year. At the time of her retirement, Smythe was one of AUT's longest serving academics, and "one of the University's most successful graduate research supervisors".

Smythe was highly commended in the 2014 AUT Vice-Chancellor's Award for Academic Excellence in Research.

== Selected works ==
- Crowther, Susan; Pam Ironside; Spence, Deborah; Smythe, Elizabeth (2016). "Crafting Stories in Hermeneutic Phenomenology Research: A Methodological Device". Qualitative Health Research. 27 (6): 826–835. doi:10.1177/1049732316656161. PMID 27354387. Wikidata Q39647070.
- David Shilbury; Lesley Ferkins; Smythe, Elizabeth (2013). "Sport governance encounters: Insights from lived experiences". Sport Management Review. 16 (3): 349–363. doi:10.1016/j.smr.2012.12.001. Wikidata Q126504959.
- Daniel J Sutton; Hocking, Clare; Smythe, Elizabeth (2012). "A phenomenological study of occupational engagement in recovery from mental illness". Canadian Journal of Occupational Therapy. 79 (3): 142–150. doi:10.2182/cjot.2012.79.3.3. PMID 22822691. Wikidata Q34347839.
- Reed, Kirk; Hocking, Clare; Smythe, Elizabeth (2010). "The interconnected meanings of occupation: The call, being‐with, possibilities". Journal of Occupational Science. 17 (3): 140–149. doi:10.1080/14427591.2010.9686688. Wikidata Q130093654.
- Smythe, Elizabeth; Giddings, Lynne Sharon (2007). "From experience to definition: addressing the question 'what is qualitative research?'". Nursing Praxis in Aotearoa New Zealand. 23 (1): 37–57. PMID 18044234. Wikidata Q53030590.
- Judith McAra-Couper; Jones, Marion; Smythe, Elizabeth (2011). "Caesarean-section, my body, my choice: The construction of 'informed choice' in relation to intervention in childbirth". Feminism & Psychology. 22 (1): 81–97. doi:10.1177/0959353511424369. Wikidata Q130093868.
