= Anne Anderson =

Anne or Ann Anderson may refer to:

- Anne Anderson (diplomat) (born 1952), ambassador of Ireland to the United States
- Anne Anderson (illustrator) (1874–1952), Scottish illustrator
- Ann Anderson (politician) (born 1952), American educator and politician
- Anne Harper Anderson, former vice principal of University of Glasgow, specializing in communications
- Anne Anderson, plaintiff in Anderson v. Cryovac
- Anne Anderson (researcher) (1937–1983), reproductive physiologist
- Anne Marie Anderson (born 1967), American sportscaster
- Ann Stewart Anderson (1935–2019), American artist
- Ann Kiessling (née Anderson; born 1942), American reproductive biologist and researcher
- Ann Kiemel Anderson (1945–2014), American religious speaker and author

== See also ==
- Anne Andersen (disambiguation)
- Anna Anderson (1896–1984), impostor who claimed to be Grand Duchess Anastasia Nikolaevna of Russia
