= Hocking (surname) =

Hocking is a surname. Notable people with the surname include:

- Amanda Hocking, American writer
- Anne Hocking, English crime writer
- Brian Hocking (1914–1974), Canadian entomologist
- Clare Hocking, New Zealand's first occupation therapy professor
- Clint Hocking (born 1972), Canadian video game director and designer
- Garry Hocking, Australian rules football player for the Geelong Football Club
- Gary Hocking, Welsh motorcycle racer
- Heath Hocking, Australian rules football player for Essendon
- Jennifer Hocking (1929–2011), Australian-born British model and magazine editor
- Joseph Hocking, Cornish novelist and United Methodist Free Church minister
- Silas Hocking, Methodist minister, and Victorian novelist
- William Ernest Hocking, American Idealist philosopher

== See also ==
- Hockings
