= 1993 New Year Honours (New Zealand) =

Annual awards for New Zealanders

The 1993 New Year Honours in New Zealand were appointments by Elizabeth II on the advice of the New Zealand government to various orders and honours to reward and highlight good works by New Zealanders. The awards celebrated the passing of 1992 and the beginning of 1993, and were announced on 31 December 1992.

The recipients of honours are listed here as they were styled before their new honour.

== Knight Bachelor ==
- The Honourable John Francis Jeffries – of Wellington; lately a judge of the High Court.
- Gordon Charles Mason OBE JP – of Warkworth. For services to local government.
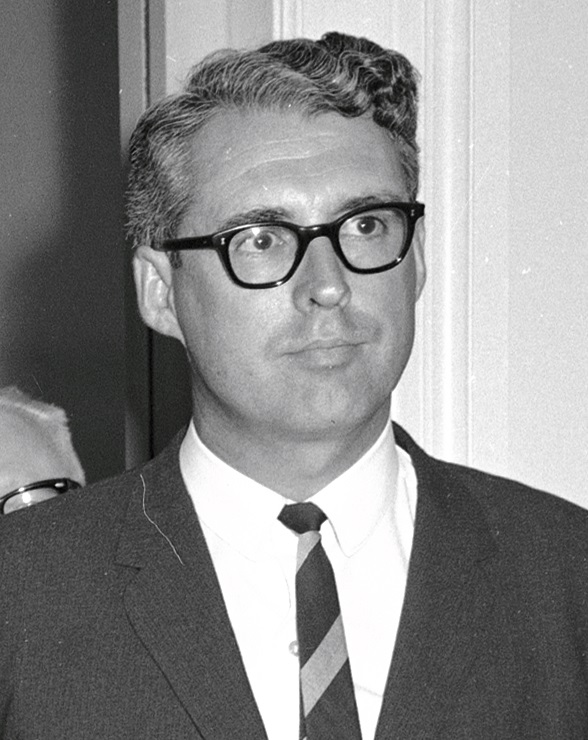
Sir John Jeffries

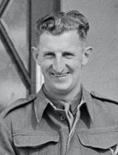
Sir Gordon Mason

== Order of Saint Michael and Saint George ==
=== Companion (CMG) ===
- Professor Margaret Clark – of Wellington. For services to education.
- The Right Honourable David Spence Thomson MC ED – of Stratford. For public services.
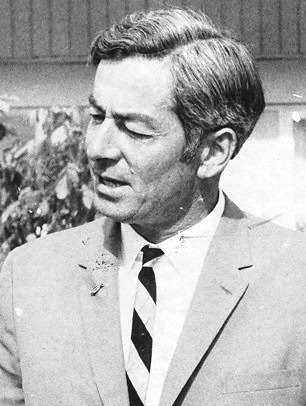
David Thomson

== Royal Victorian Order ==
=== Commander (CVO) ===
- Kenneth Lionel Richardson QSO – official secretary to the governor-general.

== Order of the British Empire ==
=== Dame Commander (DBE) ===
Civil division

- Reubina Ann Ballin CBE – of Christchurch. For services to the community.
- Helen June Patricia Evison OBE – of Wellington. For services to theatre, television and the community.
- Thea Dale, Lady Muldoon QSO – of Auckland. For services to the community.
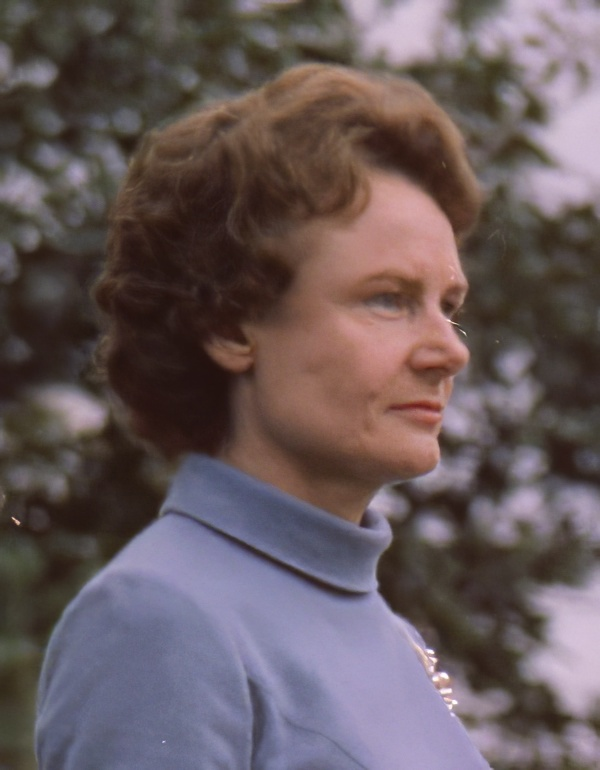
Dame Thea Muldoon

=== Commander (CBE) ===
Civil division

- Mary Valerie Eliason JP – of Hāwera. For services to Country Women's Institutes.
- John Edward Keaney QSO JP – of Rotorua. For services to local-body and community affairs.
- John Anderson Jamieson OBE – Commissioner of Police, New Zealand Police.
- Emeritus Professor Nancy Joan Kinross – of Palmerston North. For services to nursing and nursing education.
- Dr Dorothy Field Usher Potter – of Masterton. For services to ophthalmology.
- Aroha Hohipera Reriti-Crofts – of Christchurch. For services to the Māori people and the community.
- Esme Irene Tombleson QSO – of Gisborn. For services to multiple sclerosis and the community.
- Edward James Tonks – of Wellington. For services to rugby.
- Noel Henry Yarrow JP – of Manaia. For services to the baking industry, export and the community.

Military division

- Commodore Kevin Frederick Wilson LVO – Royal New Zealand Navy.
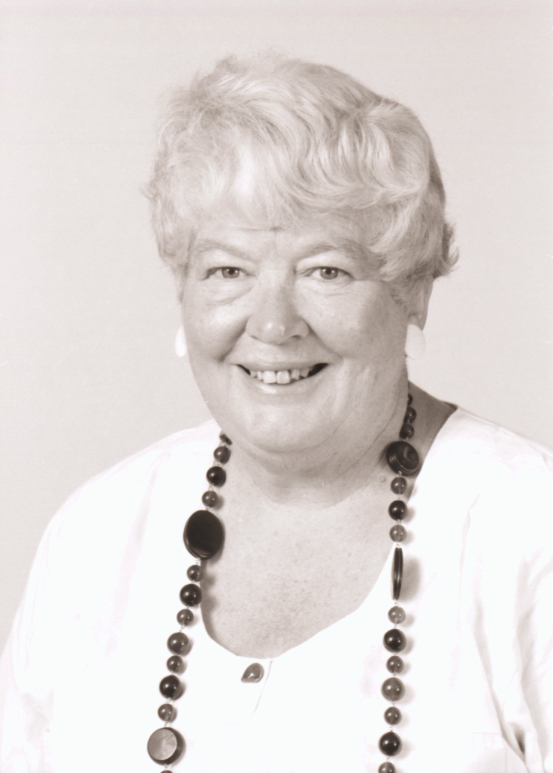
Nan Kinross

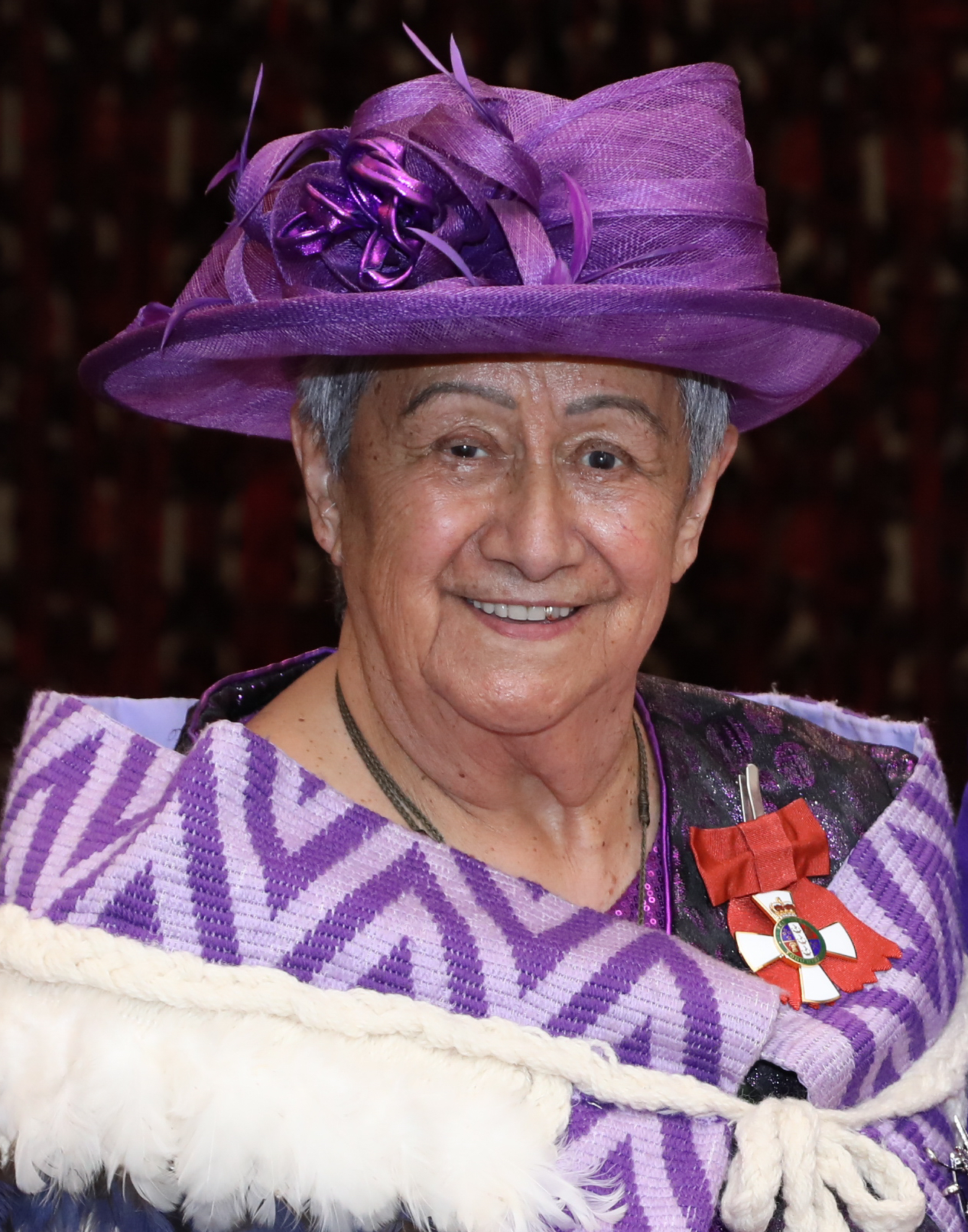
Aroha Reriti-Crofts

=== Officer (OBE) ===
Civil division

- Brian Shields Armstrong QFSM – of Wellington. For services to the New Zealand Fire Service.
- Muriel Dorothy Butler – of Auckland. For services to children's literature.
- Michael Armstrong Collins JP – of Wainuiomata; lately director-general, Department of Scientific and Industrial Research.
- Peter David Cox – of Napier. For services to the travel and tourist industries.
- Dr Keith Douglas Drayton – of Christchurch. For services to medicine and the community.
- Vivienne Mary (Vicky) Duncan – of Hunterville. For public services.
- Ann Jocelyn Gluckman JP – of Auckland. For services to education and the community.
- Mary Patricia Hanrahan (Sister Mary Hanrahan) – of Christchurch. For services to education.
- Harold Ashworth Holmes MBE JP – of Rotorua. For services to the community.
- Meredith Jane Hunter – of Blenheim. For services to the viticultural industry.
- Joanne Robin Morris – of Wellington. For public services.
- Dr Claudia Josepha Orange – of Auckland. For services to historical research.
- Wendy Ross – of Auckland. For services to the community.
- Horace Noel (Sonny) Sciascia JP – of Levin. For services to local government and sport.
- John Carl Sexton – of Masterton. For services to the disabled.
- Dr Warwick Mayne Smeeton – of Auckland. For services to sports medicine.
- Douglas Alexander Smith – of Wellington. For services to business management.
- Nadja Tollemache – of Wellington. For services to the law.

Military division

- Captain David Ninian Wood – Royal New Zealand Navy.
- Colonel David John Grant – Colonels' List, New Zealand Army.
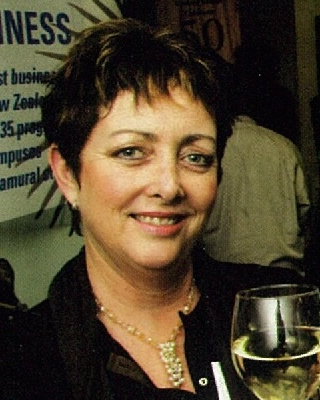
Jane Hunter

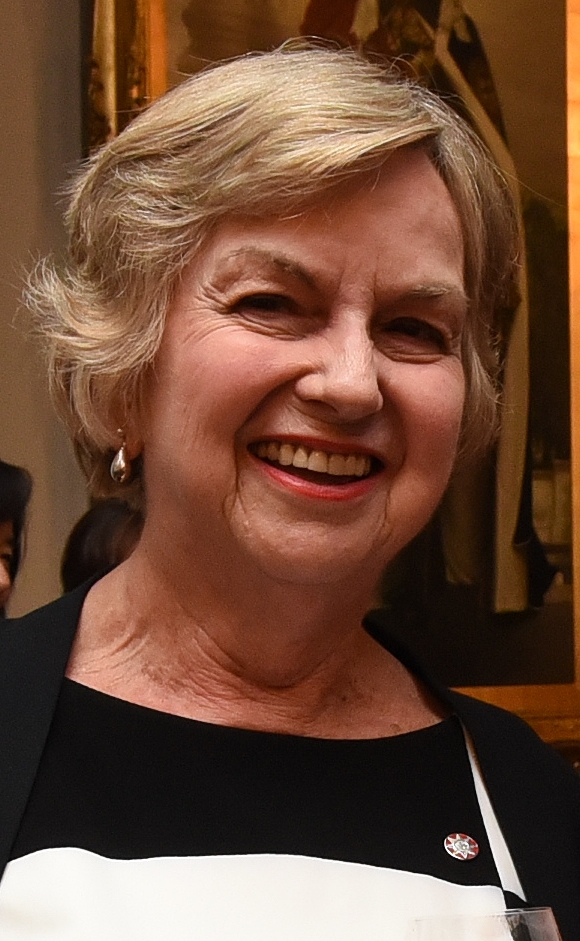
Claudia Orange

=== Member (MBE) ===
Civil division

- Erin Margaret Baker – of Christchurch. For services as a triathlete.
- Philippa June Baker – of Cambridge. For services to rowing.
- Margaret Orpah Cleland JP – of Kaiapoi. For services to the community.
- Rona Davis – of Carterton. For services as a speech and drama teacher.
- Reginald James Denny JP – of Oamaru. For services to local government.
- Perilyn Drysdale – of Christchurch. For services to manufacturing and export.
- John Albert Fauvel – of Auckland. For services to Toastmasters International.
- Henry (Harry) Neville Haythorne – of Wellington. For services to ballet.
- Charles Christianson Hood BEM – of Tauranga; lately general manager, Waikeria Prison, Department of Justice.
- Ian Alexander Hope – of Dunedin. For services to the community.
- Barbara Anne Kendall – of Auckland. For services to boardsailing.
- Angus MacAulay – of Whangārei. For services to piping.
- Thomas Wilford McKay – of Dargaville. For services to local government and the community.
- Roy Alexander McLennan – of Nelson. For services to local-body and community affairs.
- John Edwin Heremaia Marsh JP – of Rotorua. For services to the Māori people and the community.
- Lorraine Mary Moller – of Auckland. For services to athletics.
- John Lawrence Murray – of Whakatāne. For services to farming and the community.
- Jennifer Frances Newstead – of Dunedin. For services to sport.
- Betty (Jan) Nigro – of Waiheke Island. For services to art.
- John William Rose – of Auckland. For services to the community.
- Violet Schaper – of Ashburton. For services to the blind.
- Dr William Joseph Smith – of Christchurch. For services to leprosy control and the community.
- Lilian Valder – of Waihi Beach. For services to the community.
- Margaret Alxiere Yelverton (Mrs Margaret Yates) – of Christchurch. For services to the hairdressing industry.

Military division

- Lieutenant Commander Susan Jane Taylor – Royal New Zealand Navy.
- Captain and Quartermaster William John Lillicrapp – New Zealand Special Air Service.
- Squadron Leader Michael Philip Pullar – Royal New Zealand Air Force.
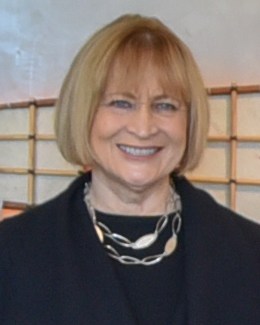
Peri Drysdale

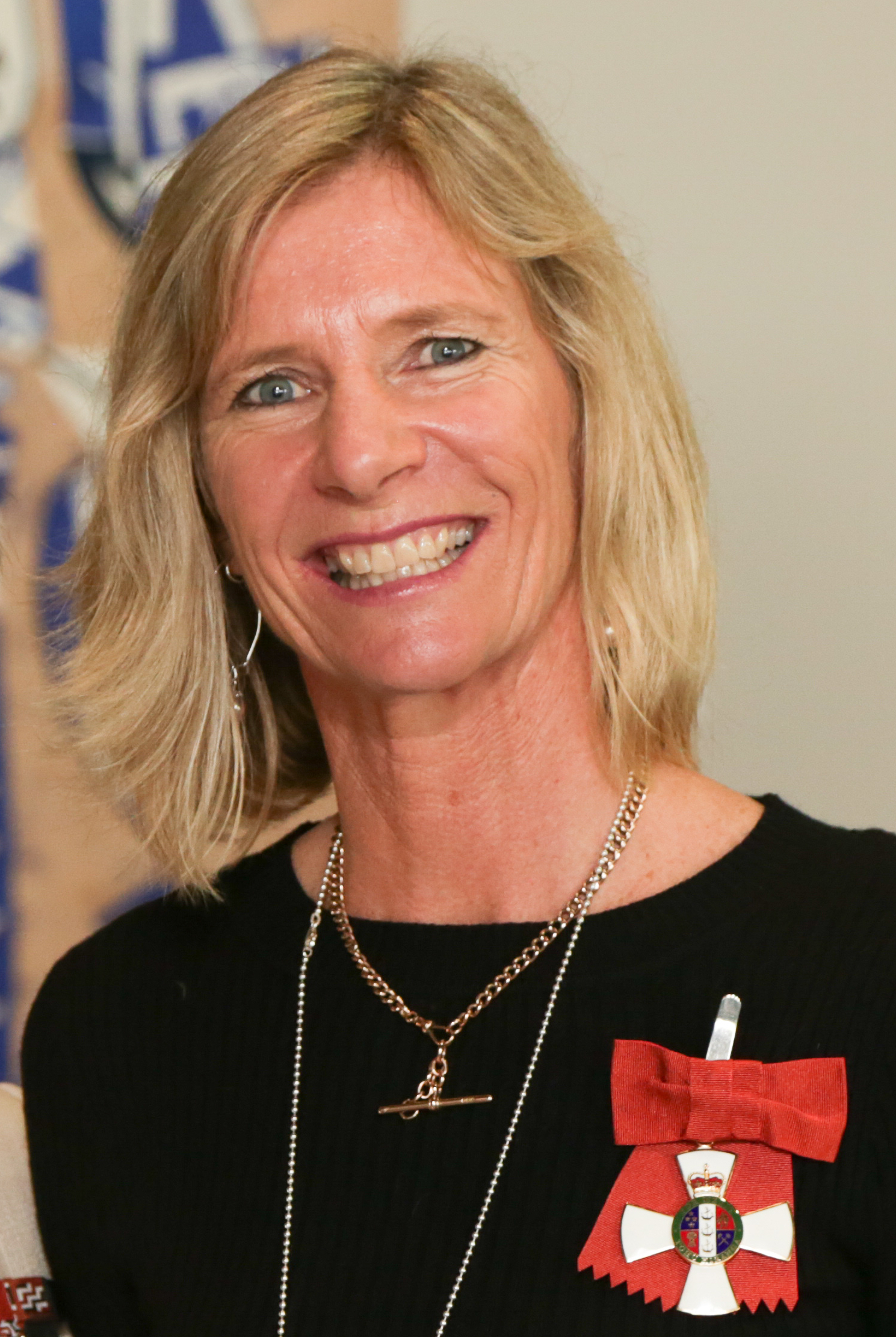
Barbara Kendall

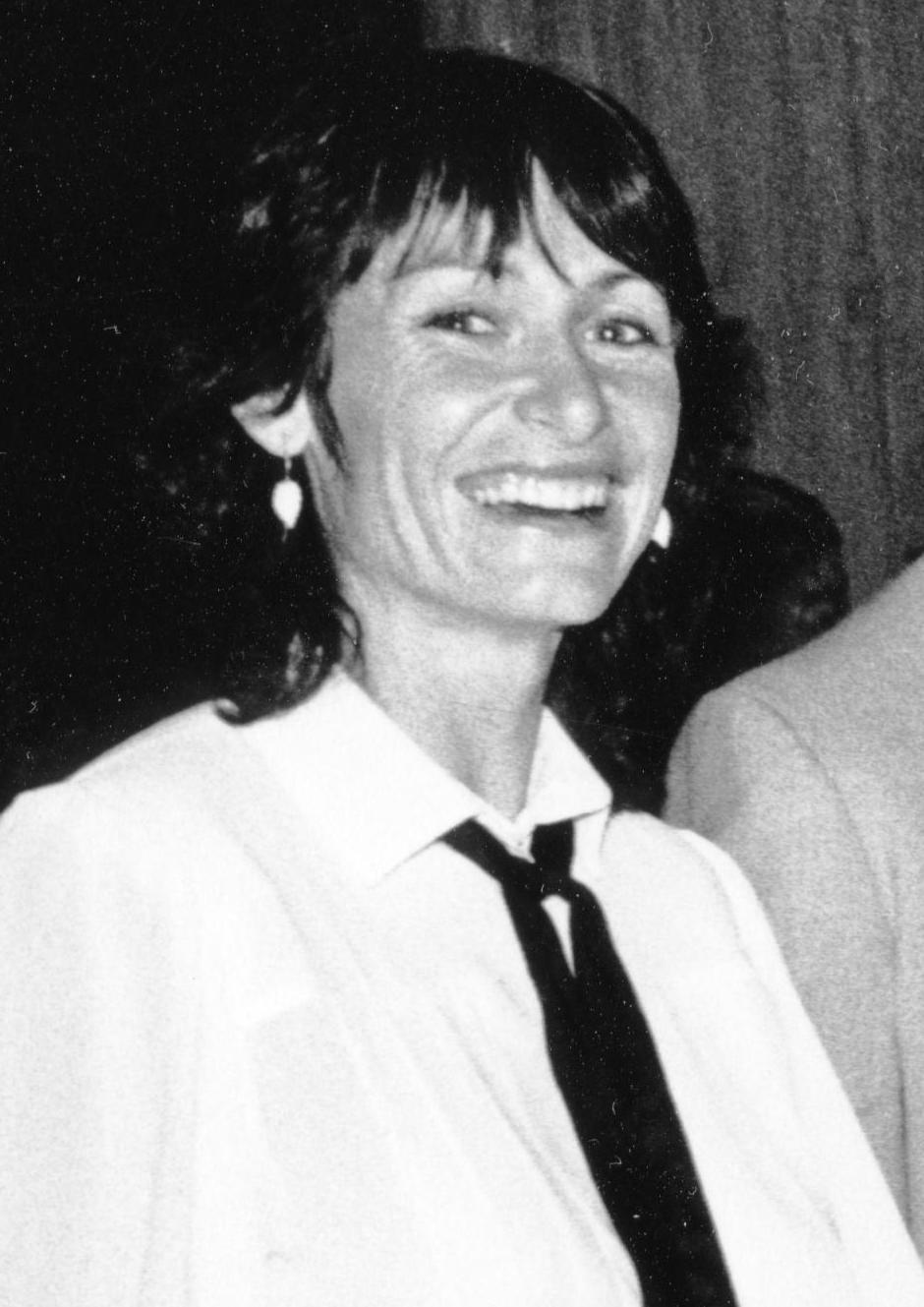
Lorraine Moller

== British Empire Medal (BEM) ==
Military division

- Chief Petty Officer Denis Kean – Royal New Zealand Naval Volunteer Reserve.
- Flight Sergeant John Paul Fleming – Royal New Zealand Air Force.

== Companion of the Queen's Service Order (QSO) ==
=== For community service ===
- Annette Marie Green (Sister Annette Green) – of Wellington.
- Peter Millais Harcourt – of Wellington.
- Valerie Gladys Newman – of Christchurch.
- Major Thelma Florence Smith – of Auckland.
- Joan Therese Timpany (Sister Joan Timpany) – of Auckland.

=== For public services ===
- Maureen Parker Howe – of Alexandra.
- Professor Tīmoti Samuel Kāretu – of Wellington.
- Dr Susan Mary Lojkine – of Auckland.
- Brian Peter MacDonell – of Dunedin.
- Charles Ernest Poynter JP – of Wanganui.
- Wilson Ernest Still – of New Plymouth.
- Joan Eileen Williamson JP – of Taupō.
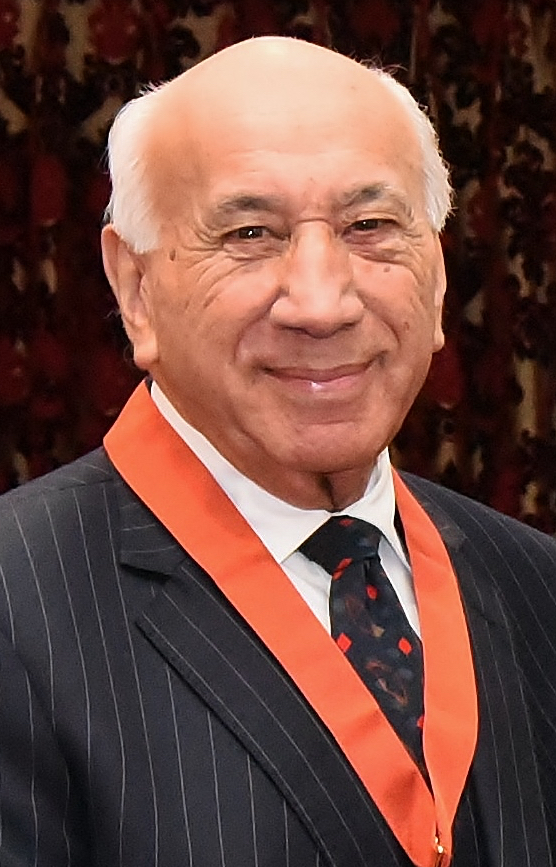
Tīmoti Kāretu

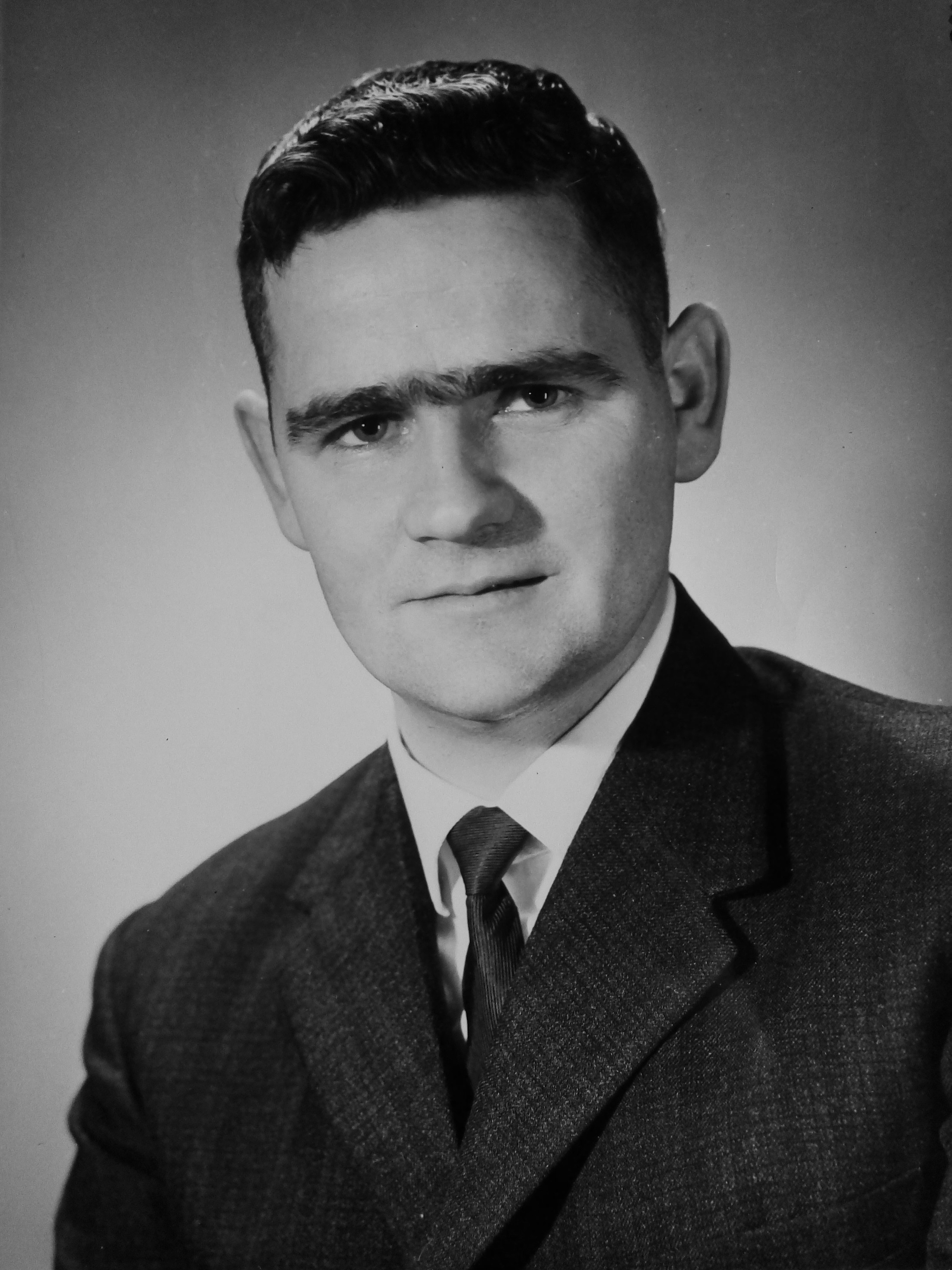
Brian MacDonell

== Queen's Service Medal (QSM) ==
=== For community service ===
- Catherine Heather Allan JP – of Palmerston North.
- Ivy Frances Ball JP – of Mangawhai.
- Dorothy May Billington – of Lower Hutt.
- Charles Harry Raymond Chester – of Christchurch.
- Raymond Henry Churchill JP – of Wellington.
- Edward John Churchouse – of Eastbourne.
- Ruth Shirley Clarke – of Hamilton.
- Leslie William Coffman – of Auckland.
- Judith Cossey – of Hastings.
- Peter Leonard Dimond JP – of Waitomo Caves.
- Bevan Thomas Dunlop – of Rangiora.
- Ranji Wilcox Ford – of Gisborne.
- Lorna Elizabeth Arlow Galbraith – of Auckland.
- Jack Gee JP – of Petone.
- Jane Ellinore Ginn – of Wellington.
- Michael Kenneth Gray – of Christchurch.
- Agnes Mary Hall – of Auckland.
- Irene Mary Hawkins – of Whangārei.
- Charles Murray Hercus – of Invercargill.
- Gerald Norman Janes – of Wellington.
- Judith Anne Keaney – of Rotorua.
- Margaret Joy Llewellyn Lewis-Benneworth (Joy Lewis) – of Invercargill.
- Hector Cunningham Low – of Timaru.
- Frances Jill McIvor – of Ballynahinch, Northern Ireland.
- Frederick Charles Munting – of Eketāhuna.
- Allison Doreen Nicol – of Christchurch.
- Evelyn Priscilla Ogilvie – of Roxburgh.
- Arthur Gordon Parry JP – of Dunedin.
- Murray John Paterson – of Invercargill.
- Molly Elizabeth Smith – of Tuamarina.
- Connie Stephens – of Raglan.
- Edith Anne Stubbersfield JP – of Christchurch.
- Edith Clifton Walkley – of Levin.
- Huia Annie Welsh – of Auckland.

=== For public services ===
- Thomas William Robert Abbott JP – of Hāwera.
- Richard Samuel Anstis JP – of Ōpōtiki.
- Mary Bourke – of Upper Hutt; office manager, Parliamentary Counsel Office.
- Allan Walter Brewster JP – of Auckland.
- Bruce Neville Broderson – of Taumarunui.
- The Venerable Gordon Alexander (Peter) Butt – of Lower Hutt.
- Ivan James Dickinson – of Milton.
- Daniel Patrick Fouhy JP – of Pahiatua.
- Maata Fuimaono – of Auckland.
- The Reverend Father Francis Patrick Garty – of Kaponga.
- Murray Ross Gallagher – detective, New Zealand Police.
- Gordon Grantham – sergeant, New Zealand Police.
- James Browning Hay JP – of Christchurch.
- Vye Anne Hepburn – of Paraparaumu.
- Pieternella (Nell) Immink – of Kawerau.
- Helen Marie Jarvie – of Wellington.
- Harry Alfred Johansen JP – of Gisborne.
- Amy Jones – of Fairlie.
- Te Aomuhurangi Te Maaka Jones JP – of Ōpōtiki.
- Thomas Andrew Kincaid – of Whangaparāoa.
- Peter Alex Lea – of Waipukurau.
- Valerie Louise Lundy – of Balclutha.
- Jessie Edith McHardy – of Motueka.
- Lorna Betsy McMillan – of Temuka.
- Jack Brayshaw Midgley MM JP – of Christchurch.
- Judith Christine Owen – of Auckland.
- Audrey Patricia Simm – of Christchurch.
- Iolanthe Small – of New Plymouth.
- Ropata Wahawaha Stirling – of Christchurch.
- Douglas James Truman – of Greymouth.
- Maryrose Wilson – of Papakura.
- Hilary Wooding JP – of Raumati South.
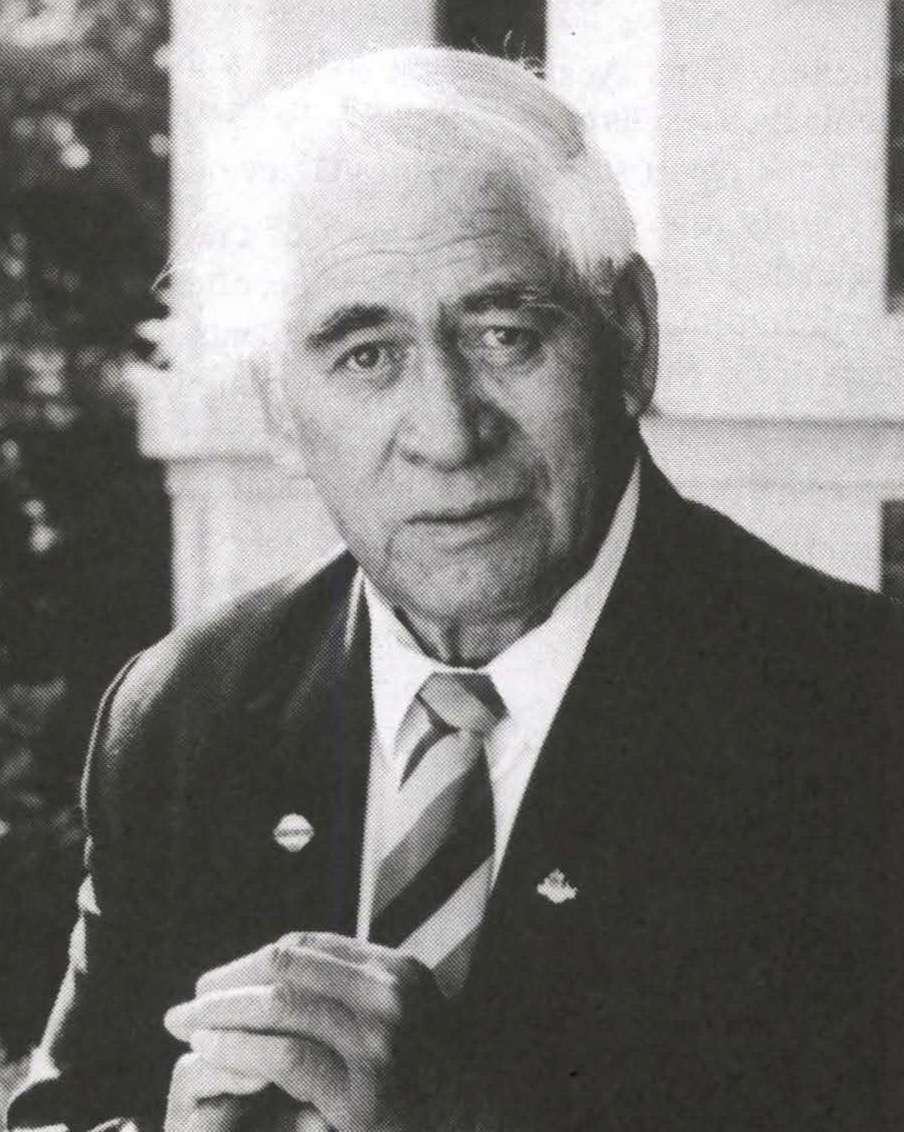
Wahawaha Stirling

== Queen's Fire Services Medal (QFSM) ==
- Hugh Carl Baker JP – senior station officer, Haumoana Volunteer Fire Brigade, New Zealand Fire Service.
- John Braidwood – chief fire officer, Alexandra Volunteer Fire Brigade, New Zealand Fire Service.
- Kenneth McLeay Watkins – chief fire officer, Te Puke Volunteer Fire Brigade, New Zealand Fire Service.

== Queen's Police Medal (QPM) ==
- Graeme George Cleland – sergeant, New Zealand Police.

== Air Force Cross (AFC) ==
- Wing Commander Brian Carruthers – Royal New Zealand Air Force.

== Queen's Commendation for Valuable Service in the Air ==
- Flight Lieutenant Ian Aubrey Tuke – Royal New Zealand Air Force.
