= Judith McAra-Couper =

New Zealand midwifery academic

- Citizenship: New Zealand
- Education: Auckland University of Technology
- Scientific career
- Doctoral students: Joyce Cowan

Judith McAra-Couper is a New Zealand academic and a professor of midwifery at Auckland University of Technology.

== Biography ==
McAra-Couper completed a diploma in midwifery at Auckland University of Technology and spent five years working in a remote village in Bangladesh. She returned to New Zealand in 1996 and was appointed a midwifery lecturer at Auckland University of Technology. She completed a PhD in 2007 titled What is shaping the practice of health professionals and the understanding of the public in relation to increasing intervention in childbirth?. Her doctoral advisors were Marion Jones and Elizabeth Smythe. In 2009 McAra-Couper was employed by the World Health Organization to design and support midwifery training and education in Bangladesh.

In 2013 McAra-Couper was appointed head of the midwifery department at Auckland University of Technology. In November 2020 she was appointed full professor, effective 1 January 2021. One of her notable doctoral students is Joyce Cowan.

McAra-Couper has held positions on midwifery organisations, including chair of the Auckland region of the New Zealand College of Midwives from 2008 to 2011, and she was appointed to the Midwifery Council of New Zealand in 2010. In the following year she became chair of the council.

== Selected works ==
- Andrea Gilkison; Sally Pairman; Judith McAra-Couper; Mary Kensington; Liz James (14 December 2015). "Midwifery education in New Zealand: Education, practice and autonomy". Midwifery. 33: 31–33. doi:10.1016/j.midw.2015.12.001. ISSN 0266-6138. PMID 26719195. Wikidata Q47868386.
- Susan Crowther; Billie Hunter; Judith McAra-Couper; Lucie Warren; Andrea Gilkison; Marion Hunter; Anna Fielder; Mavis Kirkham (8 June 2016). "Sustainability and resilience in midwifery: A discussion paper". Midwifery. 40: 40–48. doi:10.1016/j.midw.2016.06.005. ISSN 0266-6138. PMID 27428097. Wikidata Q38900544.
- Janine H Clemons; Andrea Gilkison; Tago L Mharapara; Lesley Dixon; Judith McAra-Couper (19 September 2020). "Midwifery Job Autonomy in New Zealand: I do it all the time". Women and Birth. doi:10.1016/j.wombi.2020.09.004. ISSN 1871-5192. PMID 32962945. Wikidata Q99607905.
- Joyce Cowan; Christopher J D McKinlay; Rennae S Taylor; Jess Wilson; Judith McAra-Couper; Nick Garrett; Andrea O'Brien; Lesley McCowan (19 December 2020). "Detection of small for gestational age babies and perinatal outcomes following implementation of the Growth Assessment Protocol at a New Zealand tertiary facility: An observational intervention study". Australian and New Zealand Journal of Obstetrics and Gynaecology. doi:10.1111/ajo.13283. ISSN 0004-8666. PMID 33341930. Wikidata Q104505788.
