= Joyce Cowan =

New Zealand midwifery academic

Joyce Cowan ONZM
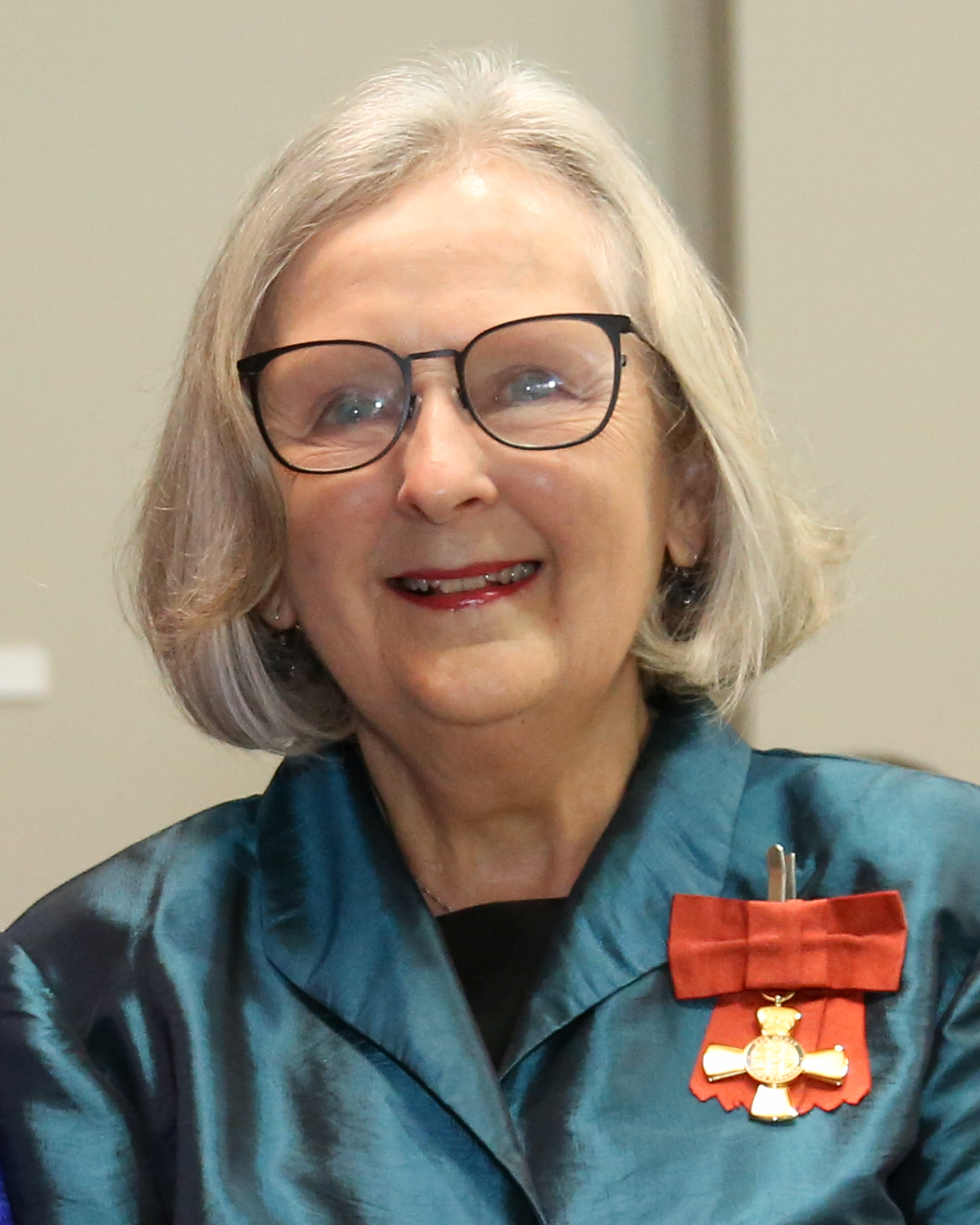
- Awards: Officer of the New Zealand Order of Merit

Academic background
- Education: Auckland University of Technology, Manurewa High School, Auckland University of Technology
- Theses: Women's experience of severe early onset preeclampsia : a hermeneutic analysis (2005); Introduction of the Growth Assessment Protocol at Counties Manukau Health, New Zealand: Effect on Detection of Small for Gestational Age Pregnancy, and Maternal and Neonatal Outcomes (2020)
- Doctoral advisor: Judith McAra-Couper, Nick Garrett, Lesley McCowan
- Other advisors: Liz Smythe, Marion Hunter

Florence Joyce Cowan ONZM is a New Zealand midwife and educator, and an authority on pre-eclampsia. She was co-founder and director of the charity NZ Action on Pre-eclampsia, and introduced the GAP programme to monitor the growth of small babies. In 2023 Cowan was appointed an Officer of the New Zealand Order of Merit for services to midwifery, after a more than fifty-year career contributing to the profession.

== Career ==
Cowan trained as a registered nurse at Middlemore Hospital in Auckland, beginning in 1966, and then travelled to Dunedin, where she intended to train as a doctor. However having recently met her husband-to-be, photographer John Cowan, she decided not to put her home life and family on hold for the necessary six years of training, and moved into midwifery instead. Cowan completed a masters titled Women's experience of severe early onset preeclampsia: a hermeneutic analysis at the Auckland University of Technology (AUT) in 2015, followed by a PhD also at AUT in 2020.

Cowan is an authority on the hypertension in pregnancy, called pre-eclampsia. She co-founded and directed the charity NZ Action on Pre-eclampsia (NZ APEC) in 1994, which raises awareness among health professionals about the condition, and supports women and their families. The NZ APEC programme is considered to have contributed to lowering the mortality rate of pre-eclampsia. Cowan also introduced a programme to monitor the growth of small babies, who are at risk of stillbirth, called the GAP (Growth Assessment Programme). Cowan had heard about the programme at a conference in America, and travelled to The Perinatal Institute in Birmingham to learn about how to apply it. After the programme's successful introduction at Middlemore, ACC provided funding to roll it out nationally. It more than doubled detection of small babies in some regions.

Before her retirement in August 2023, Cowan was a senior lecturer in the Department of Midwifery at AUT.

== Honours and awards ==
In the 2023 King's Birthday and Coronation Honours Cowan was appointed an Officer of the New Zealand Order of Merit for services to midwifery.

== Selected works ==
- Cowan, Joyce Florence; Christopher J D McKinlay; Taylor, Rennae Steele; Jess Wilson; Judith McAra-Couper; Garrett, Nick; Andrea O'Brien; McCowan, Lesley Margaret Elizabeth (2020). "Detection of small for gestational age babies and perinatal outcomes following implementation of the Growth Assessment Protocol at a New Zealand tertiary facility: An observational intervention study". Australian and New Zealand Journal of Obstetrics and Gynaecology. doi:10.1111/ajo.13283. PMID 33341930. Wikidata Q104505788.
- Cowan, Joyce Florence (2011). "Blood tests for investigating maternal wellbeing. 6. Blood tests for investigating pre-eclampsia". The practising midwife. 14 (3): 40–46. PMID 21473328. Wikidata Q83803298.
