= Jan Nigro =

New Zealand artist (1919–2012)

Jan Nigro MBE (born Betty Aislabie; 16 April 1919 — 28 March 2012) was a New Zealand artist.

== Early life ==
Nigro was born Betty Aislabie in Gisborne on 16 April 1919, the daughter of Arthur Aislabie and Olive Beatrice Aislabie (née Lange). She studied at the Elam School of Fine Arts from 1936 to 1938, under Archibald Fisher. "The figure was drummed into me by Archie Fisher," she recalled, "he dragged me into the life class, he trained me to look at the figure."

== Career ==
Nigro painted in various media, abstracts and human figures, though she is best known for her colourful nude figures. "A dressed person tells you a lot about them, about the period they lived in," she explained in a 2011 interview, "but when you get to the nude you get to the real person." She exhibited her art at the Auckland City Art Gallery in 1939, and again the following year, as a member of the Auckland Society for Arts. In 1946 she participated in a show in Sydney. Her first solo show was in Melbourne in 1948, with a second in the same city in 1950, and another upon returning to live in New Zealand in 1952. Further solo and group shows followed, with multiple exhibitions nearly every year from the mid-1960s until her death.

Nigro was appointed a Member of the Order of the British Empire in the 1993 New Year Honours, for services to art (listed as "Mrs Betty (Jan) Nigro"). She published an autobiography titled Apple for the Teacher in 1996.

In 2016 a posthumous solo exhibition of Nigro's work was mounted at the Aesthete Gallery in Hamilton, New Zealand. Her work is held in the collections of Auckland Art Gallery Toi o Tāmaki, Museum of New Zealand Te Papa Tongarewa and Waiheke Community Art Gallery

== Personal life ==
Aislabie married fellow artist and property developer Angelo (Gerry) Nigro in 1942. Gerry had a well-known cousin Giorgio Armani. They had four children together. Her son Peter died by drowning in 1992. and Gerry Nigro died in 1994. Jan also had many beloved grandchildren, one of them Diaz, who often spent his time with her around the period before her death. Jan Nigro peacefully died in her sleep in 2012. Her final moments were spent in her estate NigroEstates, which will later be inherited by her grandson Diaz. Due to large suspicions around her death led by news outlets, Jan’s family was heavily followed by paparazzi, eager to get a shot of them.
