= Anne Andersen =

Anne Andersen may refer to:

- Anne Nymark Andersen (born 1972), Norwegian footballer
- Anne Berit Andersen (born 1951), Norwegian politician
- Anne Dsane Andersen (born 1992), Danish rower
- Ann-Mari Andersen (born 1969), Sami musician from Norway

== See also ==
- Anne Anderson (disambiguation)
