= Ngaire Kerse =

New Zealand medical academic

Ngaire Kerse MNZM
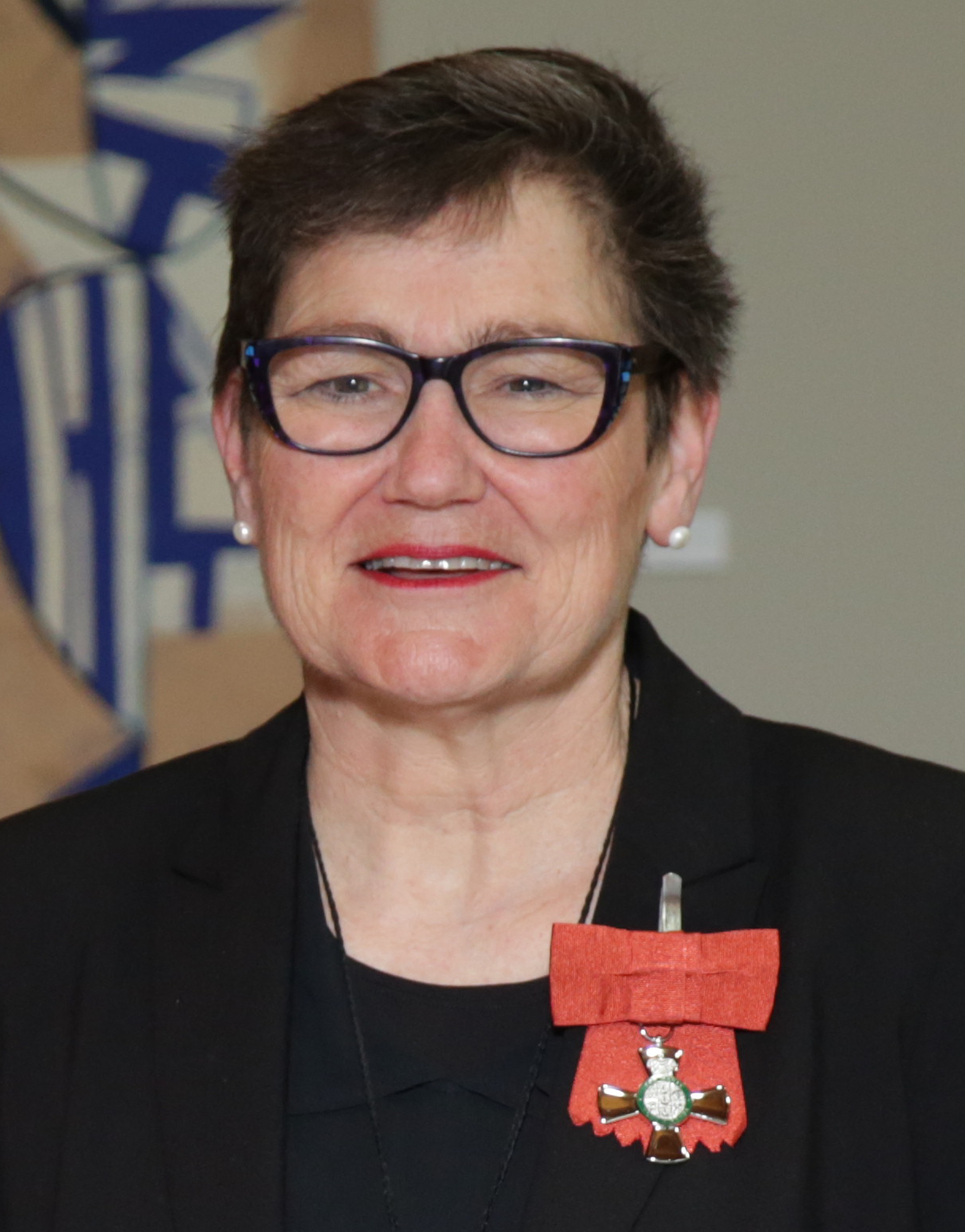
- Kerse in 2020
- Education: University of Melbourne
- Scientific career
- Fields: Medicine
- Workplaces: University of Auckland
- Thesis: Health promotion and older people : a general practice intervention study (1998)
- Doctoral students: Valerie Wright-St Clair

Ngaire Margaret Kerse MNZM is a New Zealand medical academic, and as of 2019 is a full professor at the University of Auckland.

== Academic career ==
After a 1998 PhD titled 'Health promotion and older people : a general practice intervention study' at the University of Melbourne, Kerse moved to the University of Auckland, rising to full professor. Notable students include Valerie Wright-St Clair.

== Awards and honours ==
In the 2020 New Year Honours, Kerse was appointed a Member of the New Zealand Order of Merit, for services to seniors and health.

== Selected works ==
- Ram A, Kerse N, Moyes SA, Muru-Lanning M, Wham C (2020). "Dietary Protein Intake and Determinants in Māori and Non-Māori Octogenarians. Te Puāwaitanga o Ngā Tapuwae Kia Ora Tonu: Life and Living in Advanced Age: A Cohort Study in New Zealand". Nutrients. 12 (7): 2079. doi:10.3390/nu12072079. PMC 7400903. PMID 32674307.
- Cameron ID, Dyer SM, Panagoda CE, Murray GR, Hill KD, Cumming RG, Kerse N (2018). "Interventions for preventing falls in older people in care facilities and hospitals". Cochrane Database of Systematic Reviews. 2020 (1). doi:10.1002/14651858.CD005465.pub4. PMC 6148705.
- Patterson SM, Cadogan CA, Kerse N, Cardwell CR, Bradley MC, Ryan C, Hughes C (2014). "Interventions to improve the appropriate use of polypharmacy for older people". Cochrane Database of Systematic Reviews. 2014 (10) CD008165. doi:10.1002/14651858.cd008165.pub3. PMC 6513645. PMID 25288041.
- Arroll B, Khin N, Kerse N (2003). "Screening for depression in primary care with two verbally asked questions: cross sectional study". BMJ. 327 (7424): 1144–1146. doi:10.1136/bmj.327.7424.1144. PMC 261815. PMID 14615341.
- Elley CR, Kerse N, Arroll B, Robinson E (2003). "Effectiveness of counselling patients on physical activity in general practice: cluster randomised controlled trial". BMJ. 326 (7393): 793–796. doi:10.1136/bmj.326.7393.793. PMC 153098. PMID 12689976.
