= Heather Allan =

New Zealand nurse, social worker, local politician and community leader

Councillor, Palmerston North City Council
- In office 1992–2001

Personal details
- Born: Catherine Heather Walker; 27 March 1941
- Died: 24 March 2024 (aged 82)
- Spouse: Bob Allan
- Children: 2

Catherine Heather Allan (née Walker, 27 March 1941 – 24 March 2024) was a Palmerston North city councillor, Justice of the peace and recipient of Queen's Service Medal for her community service.

== Biography ==
Heather Allan was born in Palmerston North on 27 March 1941. Her mother, Olive Walker, raised her and her sister, Sally, in Palmerston North.

Allan trained as a nurse at Palmerston North Hospital. She later retrained at Massey University and moved into social work. She later took on a role as consultant to the Social Welfare Department.

In 1978, she served on the Manawatū Branch IHC Committee, later becoming vice president in 1983 and president in 1986. In 1986, she served a term on the Palmerston North Hospital Board, and then two years further years on the Manawatu-Whanganui Area Health Board in an elected position on the board. She was later an appointed member to the policy board of the New Zealand Disabilities Resource Centre.

In 1989, she, Nan Kinross and Joan Chettleburgh found a housing for men made homeless with the closure of the Railways Hostel, and started the Mash Trust. She chaired the trust from 2009 until October 2021, and was patron until her death in 2024. The trust has found housing for hundreds of people across the lower North Island.

In 1992, she was elected to the Palmerston North City Council and served for nine years as an elected city councillor. During her time in office she was also part of the Transitional Health Authority. In 2000, she was the chairperson of the Manawatū Community Law Centre, and was the centre’s patron.

She was also a Justice of the peace for several years, retiring in 2016.

She died on 24 March 2024.

== Awards ==
In 1991, she received a Civic Honour for Community Service from the Palmerston North City Council, particularly for her service to IHC New Zealand. In 1993, she was awarded the Queen's Service Medal for Community Service. She has also received a National Police Shield.
