= Susan Crowther =

Professor of midwifery in New Zealand

Academic background
- Education: Auckland University of Technology
- Thesis: Sacred joy at birth: a hermeneutic phenomenology study (2013)
- Doctoral advisor: Liz Smythe, Deborah Spence

Susan Crowther is a British–New Zealand academic midwife, and is a full professor at the Auckland University of Technology, specialising in midwifery, birthing experiences and employing an hermeneutic phenomenology approach. She was previously a professor at the Robert Gordon University in Aberdeen.

== Academic career ==
Crowther obtained a Bachelor of Science with honours from King's College London, followed by a Master of Science degree at the University of Surrey. Crowther has worked in healthcare since 1982, and moved into midwifery in the 1990s. Moving to New Zealand, Crowther worked as a rural midwife, and then completed a PhD titled Sacred joy at birth: a hermeneutic phenomenology study at the Auckland University of Technology in 2013. Her doctoral research was supervised by Elizabeth Smythe and Deborah Spence. Crowther then joined the faculty of the Auckland University of Technology, rising to full professor. She is also a full professor at Robert Gordon University in Aberdeen, giving her inaugural professorial lecture in June 2018.

Crowther has published two books on the birthing process and is an editor for four peer-reviewed journals. She has participated in national working groups in the UK aimed at developing standards for midwifery education. Crowther is a member of the International Confederation of Midwives Research Standing Committee.

Crowther's research interests focus on childbirth, rural maternity services, sustainable practice, continuity of care, and include cultural and spiritual wellbeing and hermeneutic phenomenology.

== Selected works ==
- Davies, Lorna; Crowther, Susan, eds. (16 November 2022). Mindfulness in the Birth Sphere. Routledge. doi:10.4324/9781003165200. ISBN 978-1-003-16520-0.
- Crowther, Susan; Thomson, Gill, eds. (29 June 2022). Hermeneutic Phenomenology in Health and Social Care Research. Routledge. doi:10.4324/9781003081661. ISBN 978-1-003-08166-1.
- McFadden, Alison; Anna Gavine; Renfrew, Mary; Angela Wade; Phyll Buchanan; Taylor, Jane; Anne Marie Rennie; Crowther, Susan; Sara Neiman; Stephen MacGillivray (2017). "Support for healthy breastfeeding mothers with healthy term babies". Cochrane Database of Systematic Reviews. 2 CD001141. doi:10.1002/14651858.cd001141.pub5. PMC 6464485. PMID 28244064. Wikidata Q30235532.
- Crowther, Susan; Pam Ironside; Spence, Deborah; Smythe, Elizabeth (2016). "Crafting Stories in Hermeneutic Phenomenology Research: A Methodological Device". Qualitative Health Research. 27 (6): 826–835. doi:10.1177/1049732316656161. PMID 27354387. Wikidata Q39647070.
- Crowther, Susan; Jennifer Hall (2015). "Spirituality and spiritual care in and around childbirth". Women and Birth. 28 (2): 173–178. doi:10.1016/j.wombi.2015.01.001. PMID 25639662. Wikidata Q48051169.
- Crowther, Susan; Billie Hunter; Judith McAra-Couper; Lucie Warren; Andrea Gilkison; Hunter, Marion; Fielder, Anna; Mavis Kirkham (2016). "Sustainability and resilience in midwifery: A discussion paper". Midwifery. 40: 40–48. doi:10.1016/j.midw.2016.06.005. PMID 27428097. Wikidata Q38900544.
- Crowther, Susan; Smythe, Elizabeth; Spence, Deborah (2013). "Mood and birth experience". Women and Birth. 27 (1): 21–25. doi:10.1016/j.wombi.2013.02.004. PMID 23507333. Wikidata Q45021412.
- Crowther, Susan; Smythe, Elizabeth; Spence, Deborah (2014). "The joy at birth: an interpretive hermeneutic literature review". Midwifery. 30 (4): e157-65. doi:10.1016/j.midw.2014.01.004. PMID 24529923. Wikidata Q38188244.
