= Valerie Wright-St Clair =

New Zealand occupational therapist and social gerontology researcher

Valerie A. Wright-St Clair is a New Zealand registered occupational therapist, occupational scientist and Professor of Social Gerontology and Occupational Science in the School of Health Sciences at Auckland University of Technology (AUT).

== Academic career ==
Wright-St Clair's mother was a nurse and father a general practitioner. She completed her secondary education in Hamilton. She qualified as an occupational therapist in 1984, then practised in New Zealand hospitals and at Royal Edinburgh Hospital in Scotland.

Her career in academia began in October 1990 when she was appointed lecturer at Auckland University of Technology. In 2008 she completed a doctoral thesis titled 'Being aged' in the Everyday: uncovering the meaning through elders' stories through the University of Auckland, supervised by Ngaire Kerse and Elizabeth Smythe. In November 2018 Wright-St Clair was appointed full professor at AUT with effect from 1 January 2019.

She is co-director of the AUT Centre for Active Ageing and joint head of research in the Occupational Science and Therapy department at AUT.

== Selected works ==
=== Books ===
- Whiteford, Gail; Wright-St. Clair, Valerie (2005), Occupation and practice in context, Elsevier Churchill Livingstone
- Wright St-Clair, Valerie A.; Reid, Duncan; Shaw, Susan; Ramsbotham, Joanne, eds. (2014), Evidence Based Health Practice, Oxford University Press, ISBN 978-0-19-559659-5

=== Articles ===
- Shoba Nayar; Valerie A Wright-St Clair (1 December 2018). "Strengthening Community: Older Asian Immigrants' Contributions to New Zealand Society". Journal of Cross-Cultural Gerontology. 33 (4): 355–368. doi:10.1007/S10823-018-9357-5. ISSN 0169-3816. PMID 30209720. Wikidata Q56885779.
- Gary Cheung; Valerie Wright-St Clair; Emme Chacko; Yoram Barak (10 August 2019). "Financial difficulty and biopsychosocial predictors of loneliness: A cross-sectional study of community dwelling older adults". Archives of Gerontology and Geriatrics. 85: 103935. doi:10.1016/J.ARCHGER.2019.103935. ISSN 0167-4943. PMID 31446186. Wikidata Q92846730.
- Daniel W O'Brien; Sandra Bassett; Valerie Wright-St Clair; Richard J Siegert (10 April 2020). "Can the Pain Attitudes and Beliefs Scales be adapted for use in the context of osteoarthritis with general practitioners and physiotherapists?". BMC Rheumatology. 4: 15. doi:10.1186/S41927-020-0116-1. ISSN 2520-1026. PMC 7147025. PMID 32309777. Wikidata Q92071332.
- Jed Montayre; Stephen Neville; Ihaka Dunn; Jagamaya Shrestha-Ranjit; Valerie Wright-St Clair (29 June 2020). "What makes community-based physical activity programs for culturally and linguistically diverse older adults effective? A systematic review". Australasian Journal on Ageing. doi:10.1111/AJAG.12815. ISSN 1440-6381. PMC 7818171. PMID 32597566. Wikidata Q96768800.
