= Clare Hocking =

New Zealand occupational therapy academic

- Education: Auckland University of Technology
- Scientific career
- Fields: occupational therapy
- Workplaces: Auckland University of Technology
- Thesis: The relationship between objects and identity in occupational therapy: a dynamic balance of rationalism and romanticism (2004)

Clare Hocking is a New Zealand occupational therapy academic, and New Zealand's first occupational therapy professor. She is currently a full professor at the Auckland University of Technology and an honorary professor at Plymouth University.

== Academic career ==
After a 2004 PhD titled "The relationship between objects and identity in occupational therapy: a dynamic balance of rationalism and romanticism" from the Auckland University of Technology, she became full professor at Auckland University of Technology, the first professor of occupational therapy in New Zealand.

She also holds an honorary professorship from Plymouth University and has served multiple terms on the Occupational Therapy Board.

== Selected works ==
- Hocking, Clare. "Function or feelings: factors in abandonment of assistive devices." Technology and Disability 11, no. 1, 2 (1999): 3–11.
- Baskett, Jonathan J., Joanna B. Broad, Gabrielle Reekie, Clare Hocking, and Geoff Green. "Shared responsibility for ongoing rehabilitation: a new approach to home-based therapy after stroke." Clinical Rehabilitation 13, no. 1_suppl (1999): 23–33.
- Whiteford, Gail, Elizabeth Townsend, and Clare Hocking. "Reflections on a renaissance of occupation." Canadian Journal of Occupational Therapy 67, no. 1 (2000): 61–69.
- Hocking, Clare. "The challenge of occupation: Describing the things people do." Journal of Occupational Science 16, no. 3 (2009): 140–150.
- Hocking, Clare. "Occupational science: A stock take of accumulated insights." Journal of Occupational Science 7, no. 2 (2000): 58–67.
