= Hocking =

Hocking may refer to:

== Places ==
- Hocking County, Ohio, United States
- Hocking Township, Fairfield County, Ohio
- Hocking Hills, Ohio
- Hocking River, Ohio
- Hocking Canal, a former canal that ran parallel to the Hocking River
- Hocking, Western Australia, a suburb of Perth, Western Australia, located within the City of Wanneroo

== People ==
- Hocking (surname)
- Hocking H. Hunter (1801–1872), American politician

== Other uses ==
- Hocking College, Ohio
- Hocking Correctional Facility, Hocking County, Ohio
- USS Hocking (APA-121), a World War II attack transport

== See also ==
- Hocking House, Maryland, United States, on the National Register of Historic Places
