= Joan Williamson-Orr =

New Zealand mayor (died 2023)

Joan Williamson-Orr QSO JP

Last Mayor of Taupō Borough Council
- In office 1986–1988
- Preceded by: Clem Currie

1st Mayor of Taupō District
- In office 1988–2001
- Succeeded by: Clayton Stent

Personal details
- Born: Joan Eileen Russell; 17 October 1930
- Died: 2 March 2023 (aged 92)
- Relatives: Dane Cleaver (grandson); Kane Williamson (grandson)

Joan Eileen Williamson-Orr QSO JP (née Russell; 17 October 1930 – 2 March 2023), also known as Joan Williamson, was the mayor of Taupō, New Zealand, from 1986 to 2001. Her five election wins included the last mayoralty of the old Taupō Borough Council, and the first to find the Mayor of Taupō District, in 1988.

== Political career ==
Williamson-Orr, campaigning as Joan Williamson, was first elected to the Taupō Borough Council in 1977. From 1983 to 1986, she was deputy mayor. In 1986, Clem Currie retired and Williamson was elected mayor.

In 1988, the new Taupō District held its first elections, returning Williamson as mayor. She held that position until retiring in 2001.

In all, she won five mayoral elections.

== Honours and awards ==
In 1990, Williamson received the New Zealand 1990 Commemoration Medal. She was awarded the New Zealand Suffrage Centennial Medal in 1993. In the 1993 New Year Honours, she was appointed a Companion of the Queen's Service Order for public services. Taupō's Joan Williamson Rose Garden was named for her in 2007.

== Family ==
Williamson was twice married, firstly to Stuart Williamson and later to Tom Orr, and had six children. Her son, John Williamson, was first elected to the Taupō District Council in 2013. Announcing his departure from local politics in 2025, John credited his mother with having given him the motivation to get involved.

Two of Joan's grandsons, Kane Williamson and Dane Cleaver, have played cricket for New Zealand. A granddaughter, Louisa Williamson, is known as a saxophonist and composer.

== Death ==
Williamson died on 2 March 2023, aged 92.
