= Louise Rummel =

New Zealand nurse educator (1937–2025)

Louise Rummel MNZM
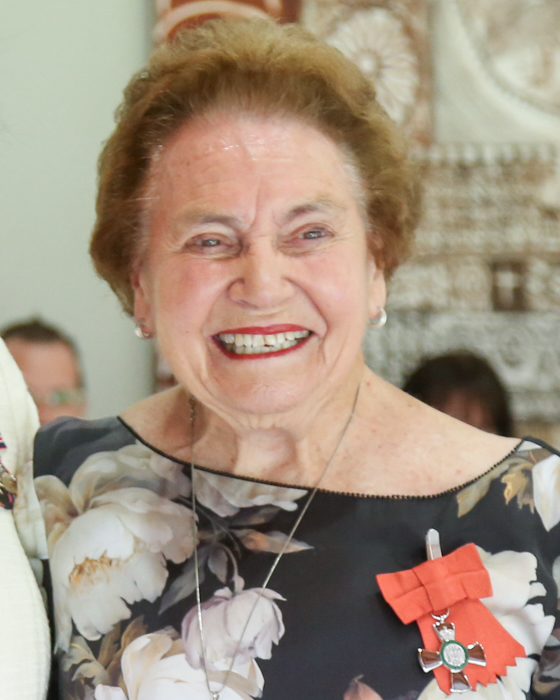
- Rummel in 2024
- Born: Louise Gladys Grant; 2 March 1937; Wellington, New Zealand
- Died: 21 August 2025 (aged 88); Auckland, New Zealand
- Spouse: Stuart Rummel (m. 1960; died 2006)
- Children: 3

Academic background
- Education: Massey University
- Theses: The proving ground: the lived world of nursing students in their pre-registration clinical experience (1993); Safeguarding the practices of nursing : the lived experience of being-as preceptor to undergraduate student nurses in acute care settings (2001)
- Doctoral advisor: Julie Boddy; Nancy L. Diekelmann; Rita Monsen; Liz Smythe
- Other advisors: Irena Madjar; Norma Chick

Academic work
- Discipline: Nursing education
- Institutions: Wellington Hospital; Manukau Institute of Technology

Louise Gladys Rummel MNZM (née Grant; 2 March 1937 – 21 August 2025) was a New Zealand nurse and nursing educator. She taught at Manukau Institute of Technology for forty years. Rummel was made an honorary member of the New Zealand Nurses Organisation in 2004. In 2024, she was appointed a Member of the New Zealand Order of Merit, for services to nursing education.

== Early life and family ==
Rummel was born Louise Gladys Grant in Wellington on 2 March 1937, the third daughter of William and Molly Grant. Her early years were spent living at Kaitoke, before the family moved to Lower Hutt. She was educated at Wellington Girls' College, and then worked for the Bank of New Zealand and the New Zealand National Airways Corporation, before enrolling for nursing training in 1957. On 17 December 1960, she married Stuart William Rummel, and the couple went on to have three children.

== Nursing and academic career ==
Rummel trained as a nurse at Wellington Hospital, achieving registration in 1960. Rummel worked in a number of clinical areas, including occupational health, where she established the first occupational health clinic for New Zealand railway workers, from 1962 to 1967. Rummel joined the School of Nursing at Manukau Institute of Technology in 1984, where she was a clinical tutor at Middlemore Hospital, the deputy head of the department, and principal lecturer over forty years. She also led the development of the nursing diploma programme into the Bachelor of Nursing degree. Rummel completed a master's degree on nursing student experiences pre-registration in 1993, and a PhD with a thesis titled Safeguarding the practices of nursing: the lived experience of being-as preceptor to undergraduate student nurses in acute care settings at Massey University in 2001.

Rummel worked in the field of nursing history, and led the writing of a history of the Department of Nursing and Health Studies, which was published in 2015. Rummel led the most recent section of the Nursing Oral History Project, which finished in 2023. She served on the review panel of the journal Kai Tiaki Nursing Research.

== Later life and death ==
Rummel officially retired from Manukau Institute of Technology on 4 July 2025. She died in Auckland less than two months later, on 21 August 2025, at the age of 88. She had been predeceased by her husband, Stuart Rummel, in 2006.

== Honours and awards ==
In 2004, Rummel was made an honorary member of the New Zealand Nurses Organisation. In the 2024 King's Birthday Honours, Rummel was appointed a Member of the New Zealand Order of Merit, for services to nursing education.

== Selected works ==
- Rummel, Louise; Delugar, Annette; Hansen, Jens J. (2015). What Jan began: preparing students for healthcare careers at Manukau Institute of Technology: the first 25 years. Auckland: Manukau Institute of Technology.
- Rummel, Louise Gladys (2006). "Looking back and looking forward". Nursing Praxis in Aotearoa New Zealand. 32 (1): 5–7. doi:10.36951/ngpxnz.2016.001. Wikidata Q130263277.
