= Norma Chick =

New Zealand professor of nursing and midwifery

Academic background
- Education: Australian National University
- Thesis: Interpersonal needs, norms and performance in nursing (1974)
- Doctoral advisor: Cecil Austin Gibb, Patrick Pentony, Margaret R. Middleton

Norma P. Chick is an Australian–New Zealand academic, and is an Emeritus Professor of Nursing and Midwifery at Massey University. Alongside Professor Nan Kinross, she is credited with the introduction of nursing academia in New Zealand.

== Academic career ==
Chick began her initial nursing training in Melbourne in June 1947. She later reflected that little of her nursing training encompassed nursing scholarship, and dealt mostly with facts from medicine or psychology rather than concepts. In 1960 she spent a year at the College of Nursing (now the Australian College of Nursing) in Melbourne. The following year she enrolled as an external student in philosophy at the University of Melbourne, and despite encouragement to continue that path, turned afterwards to studying psychology, completing an honours project in the area. Chick moved to New Zealand, where she joined the faculty of the Department of Psychology at Massey University in 1971. In 1972 the Nursing Studies Unit was established under Nan Kinross, and Chick transferred there. Along with Nan Kinross, Chick introduced the first courses in nursing studies at Massey in Palmerston North in 1974. Chick completed a PhD titled Interpersonal needs, norms and performance in nursing at the psychology department at Australian National University in 1974. Her thesis was supervised by Cecil Gibb, Patrick Pentony and Margaret R. Middleton. When she was appointed half-time lecturer in nursing studies at Massey in 1976, she became the first staff member to hold a PhD. One of Chick's students, Louise Rummel, said "She can be credited with influencing the mind-set of a whole generation of nurses from thinking of nursing as only a practical occupation supported by procedural knowledge to one that is scientifically based on sound evidence to provide a clear rationale for nursing judgements and actions."

While Chick was head of that same department in 1992, she published a history of the first twenty years of nursing studies at Massey. Chick was appointed full professor in 1988, as Chair of Nursing Studies. She retired in February 1993, and was appointed emeritus professor. Chick was an invited speaker at the International Nurses Conference held in Newcastle in 1995. Chick was a member of the editorial board of Nursing Praxis in New Zealand from when it was launched in 1985 to 2016.

In 2006 Nan Kinross and Chick published a joint memoir in 2006 through the Nurses Organisation.

== Selected works ==
- Chick, Norma P.; Kinross, Nan (2006). Chalk and Cheese - Trail-Blazing in NZ Nursing: A Story Told Through Memoir. NZ Nurses Organisation. ISBN 9780473108366.
- Chick, Norma; Rodgers, Jan A. (1997). Looking back, moving forward : essays in the history of New Zealand nursing and midwifery. Massey University, Dept. of Nursing and Midwifery. ISBN 9780473047542.
- Chick, Norma Patricia (1987). "Nursing research in New Zealand". Western Journal of Nursing Research. 9 (3): 317–334. doi:10.1177/019394598700900304. PMID 3314150. Wikidata Q39676513.
