= Hockings =

Hockings is a surname. Notable people with the surname include:

- Albert John Hockings (1826–1890), mayor of Brisbane, Queensland, Australia
- Lucy Hockings (born 1974), New Zealand television journalist
- Paul Hockings (born 1935), British anthropologist

== See also ==
- Hocking (disambiguation)
