= David Shilbury =

Australian sport management academic (born 20th century)

David Shilbury AM
- Born: David Ernest Shilbury
- Occupation: Academic
- Known for: Sport management; sport governance research
- Title: Emeritus Professor
- Awards: Member of the Order of Australia (2025); Earle F. Zeigler Award (2011)

Academic background
- Education: Monash University (PhD); University of Massachusetts Amherst (MSc)

Academic work
- Discipline: Sport management
- Sub-discipline: Sport governance, strategy, sport development
- Institutions: Deakin University
- Main interests: Sport governance, strategic management, journal quality
- Notable works: Strategic Sport Marketing; Sport Management in Australia

David Ernest Shilbury AM is an emeritus professor at Deakin University specialising in sport management. He was Australia's first professor of sport management, appointed to the foundation chair in 2000.

He also directed the Deakin Sport Network. His research on governance, strategy and sport development, along with textbooks such as Strategic Sport Marketing and Sport Management in Australia, contributed to the development of sport management as an academic field in the country.

In 2011 he became the first scholar from outside North America to win the Earle F. Zeigler Award, which North American Society for Sport Management (NASSM) regards as its highest honour. He was appointed a Member of the Order of Australia in the 2025 King's Birthday Honours for his service to sport management.

== Early life and education ==
Shilbury trained as a teacher, earning a Diploma of Teaching in 1978 and a Bachelor of Applied Science in Recreation in 1986, both at the Western Australian College of Advanced Education (now Edith Cowan University). He went on to complete a Master of Science in sport management at the University of Massachusetts Amherst in 1989, then a PhD at Monash University in 1995 on the strategic planning practices of Australian Football League clubs.

== Academic career ==
Before moving into academia, Shilbury worked in sport administration, for the Western Australian Golf Association, the City of Stirling, and the Australian Cricket Board at the WACA. He joined what was then Victoria College as a senior lecturer in 1990, made associate professor in 1997, and became the university's foundation professor of sport management in 2000.

At Deakin he developed the school's business-based sport management programs, including the Bachelor of Business (Sport Management) and Master of Business (Sport Management), and headed the School of Management and Marketing from 2002 to 2007.

He also held international posts: honorary visiting professor at Coventry University (2013–2015) and adjunct faculty in Seoul National University's Global Sport Management Program (2015–2018).

== Research and publications ==
Shilbury researches sport governance, strategic management and sport development, and his work has been cited more than 8,000 times on Google Scholar.

He co-authored Strategic Sport Marketing, first published in 1998 and now in its fifth edition (2022), and he leads Sport Management in Australia, now in its sixth edition (Routledge, 2023). He also co-edited the Routledge Handbook of Sport Governance (2020) and edited A Research Agenda for Sport Management (2022).

=== Editorships ===
Shilbury was editor-in-chief of the Journal of Sport Management from 2015 to 2018, after earlier serving as associate and senior associate editor, and edited Sport Management Review from 2002 to 2004.

== Sports administration ==
Shilbury was the foundation president of the Sport Management Association of Australia and New Zealand (SMAANZ) from 1995 to 2001. He was a member of the Australian Football League Tribunal from 1992 to 2003 and a director of Peninsula Leisure from 2013 to 2018.

In golf administration, Shilbury joined the board of Golf Victoria in 2014 and has served as its president since 2022; he was appointed to Golf Australia's Nominations Committee in 2024.

== Awards and honours ==
- 2009 – Research Fellow, North American Society for Sport Management
- 2009 – Inaugural Distinguished Service Award, Sport Management Association of Australia and New Zealand
- 2011 – Earle F. Zeigler Award, North American Society for Sport Management
- 2024 – Research Fellow, Sport Management Association of Australia and New Zealand
- 2025 – Fellow, Australian Institute of Company Directors
- 2025 – Member of the Order of Australia, for significant service to sport management

== Selected works ==
- Karg, A., Shilbury, D., Westerbeek, H., Funk, D., & Naraine, M. (2022). Strategic Sport Marketing (5th ed.). Routledge. ISBN 9781760878801
- Shilbury, D. (Ed.). (2022). A Research Agenda for Sport Management. Edward Elgar. ISBN 9781800378315
- Shilbury, D., & Ferkins, L. (Eds.). (2020). Routledge Handbook of Sport Governance. Routledge. ISBN 9781138341234
- Shilbury, D., Phillips, P., Karg, A., Rowe, K., & Fujak, H. (2023). Sport Management in Australia: Organisation, Development and Global Perspectives (6th ed.). Routledge. ISBN 9781032330242
