= Marion Jones (nurse) =

New Zealand nursing academic

Marion Jones ONZM
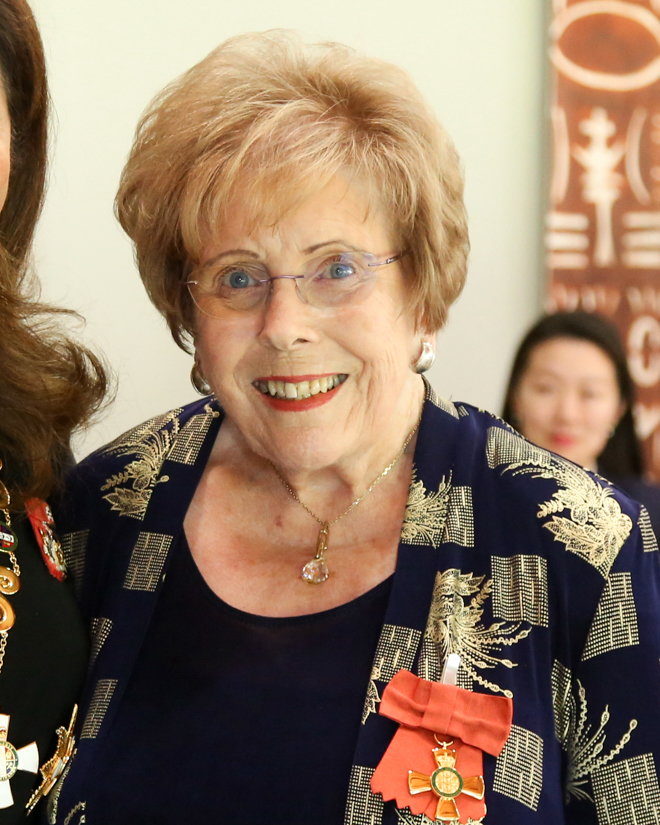
- Jones in 2024
- Born: 1944 (age 81–82)
- Education: Flinders University of South Australia
- Scientific career
- Fields: Interprofessional education and perioperative nursing
- Workplaces: Auckland University of Technology
- Thesis: Shaping team practice in the context of health reform opportunities, tensions, benefits (2001)
- Doctoral students: Judith McAra-Couper

Edith Marion Jones ONZM (born 1944) is a New Zealand nursing academic. As of September 2018 she is a full professor at the Auckland University of Technology.

== Academic career ==
After a 1993 Master's titled Shaping nursing praxis: some registered nurses' perceptions and beliefs of theory practice from Massey University and a 2001 PhD titled Shaping team practice in the context of health reform opportunities, tensions, benefits at Flinders University of South Australia, Jones moved to the Auckland University of Technology, rising to full professor. Notable students include Judith McAra-Couper.

In 2015, Jones was honored by the New Zealand Nurses Organisation's, with NZNO president Marion Guy saying that "Jones' contribution to nursing, and in particular perioperative nursing both nationally and internationally was "exemplary".

Jones is an auditor for the Academic Quality Agency for New Zealand Universities (AQA).

In the 2024 New Year Honours, Jones was appointed an Officer of the New Zealand Order of Merit, for services to education.

== Selected works ==
- Reid, Duncan, Marion Jones, and Daniel O’Brien. "Building interprofessional leadership in a clinical setting." In Leadership and Collaboration, pp. 169–181. Palgrave Macmillan, London, 2015.
- Flood, Brenda, Daniel O’Brien, and Marion Jones. "Interprofessional health care team challenge: A New Zealand perspective." In Leading research and evaluation in interprofessional education and collaborative practice, pp. 267–283. Palgrave Macmillan, London, 2016.
- Jones, Marion, Antoinette McCallin, and Susan Shaw. "Reflections from New Zealand: Facilitating Cultural Change." In Leadership development for interprofessional education and collaborative practice, pp. 179–195. Palgrave Macmillan, London, 2014.
