= Lesley Ferkins =

Sports management academic

Academic background
- Education: Victoria University of Wellington
- Alma mater: Deakin University
- Thesis: Sport Governance: Developing strategic capability in national sport organisations (2007)

Lesley Ferkins is a New Zealand sports management academic and professor in the School of Sport and Recreation at Auckland University of Technology.

== Academic career ==
Ferkins graduated with an MA in recreation and leisure studies from Victoria University of Wellington in 1992. After a PhD titled Sport Governance: Developing strategic capability in national sport organisations at Deakin University, where she also worked as senior lecturer, Ferkins returned to New Zealand as associate professor at Unitec Institute of Technology. In 2015 she moved to Auckland University of Technology as associate professor, rising to full professor in 2018.

== Selected works ==
- Cunningham, George B.; Fairley, Sheranne; Ferkins, Lesley; Kerwin, Shannon; Lock, Daniel; Shaw, Sally; Wicker, Pamela (February 2018). "eSport: Construct specifications and implications for sport management". Sport Management Review. 21 (1): 1–6. doi:10.1016/j.smr.2017.11.002. hdl:10072/391668. S2CID 149401469.
- Ferkins, Lesley; Skinner, James; Swanson, Steve (1 March 2018). "Sport Leadership: A New Generation of Thinking". Journal of Sport Management. 32 (2): 77–81. doi:10.1123/jsm.2018-0054. ISSN 0888-4773.
- Billsberry, Jon; Mueller, Jacqueline; Skinner, James; Swanson, Steve; Corbett, Ben; Ferkins, Lesley (1 March 2018). "Reimagining Leadership in Sport Management: Lessons From the Social Construction of Leadership". Journal of Sport Management. 32 (2): 170–182. doi:10.1123/jsm.2017-0210. ISSN 0888-4773. S2CID 148896910.
- Bryham, Gaye; Ferkins, Lesley; Dee, Katie; Mueller, Jacqueline (21 May 2019), "Women's involvement in sport governance", in Lough, Nancy; Geurin, Andrea N. (eds.), Routledge Handbook of the Business of Women's Sport (1 ed.), Routledge, pp. 316–328, doi:10.4324/9780203702635-25, ISBN 978-0-203-70263-5, S2CID 181792544
- Austin, Diana M.; Ferkins, Lesley; Swann, Jennie; Smythe, Elizabeth (March 2020). "Being "nice": A complex activity among health professionals following a critical incident". Systems Research and Behavioral Science. 37 (2): 199–210. doi:10.1002/sres.2614. S2CID 202268600.
