= Lesley McCowan =

New Zealand medical researcher

Lesley McCowan CNZM
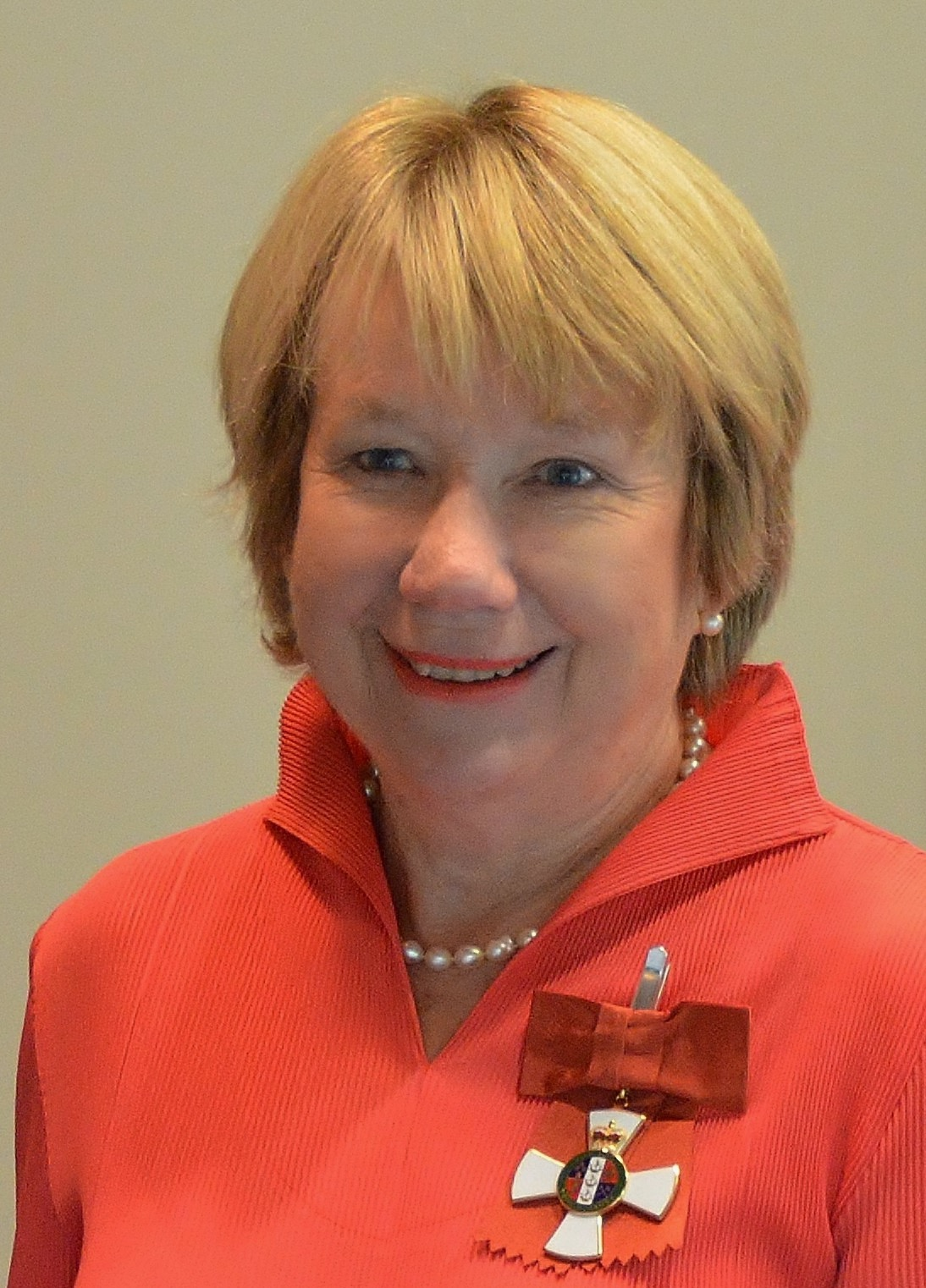
- McCowan in 2016
- Other name: Lesley Margaret Elizabeth McCowan
- Education: University of Auckland
- Scientific career
- Fields: Obstetrics and gynaecology
- Workplaces: University of Auckland
- Thesis: Doppler studies in small for gestational age pregnancies and the influence of perinatal variables on postnatal outcomes (1999)
- Doctoral advisor: Michael Gillmer, Anne Anderson
- Doctoral students: Joyce Cowan

Lesley Margaret Elizabeth McCowan CNZM is a New Zealand medical researcher and academic specialising in maternal health. She is currently a full professor and head of obstetrics and gynaecology at the University of Auckland.

== Academic career ==
McCowan holds a PhD from the University of Auckland for her 1999 thesis titled "Doppler studies in small for gestational age pregnancies and the influence of perinatal variables on postnatal outcomes". Her research focuses in high risk pregnancy especially preeclampsia and fetal growth restriction, with recent high-profile work on maternal sleeping positions alcohol, and obesity as risk factors. One of McCowan's notable doctoral students is Joyce Cowan.

== Honours ==
In the 2011 New Year Honours, McCowan was appointed an Officer of the New Zealand Order of Merit, for services to health. In the 2016 New Year Honours, she was promoted to Companion of the New Zealand Order of Merit, also for services to health. She was awarded the Health Research Council of New Zealand's Beaven Medal in recognition of her and her team's finding that stillbirths were more likely in women who slept on their backs.

== Selected works ==
- Sadler, Lynn, Audrey Saftlas, Wenquan Wang, Melissa Exeter, John Whittaker, and Lesley McCowan. "Treatment for cervical intraepithelial neoplasia and risk of preterm delivery." JAMA 291, no. 17 (2004): 2100–2106.
- North, Robyn A., Lesley ME McCowan, Gustaaf A. Dekker, Lucilla Poston, Eliza HY Chan, Alistair W. Stewart, Michael A. Black et al. "Clinical risk prediction for pre-eclampsia in nulliparous women: development of model in international prospective cohort." BMJ 342 (2011): d1875.
- Keelan, Jeffrey A., Keith W. Marvin, Timothy A. Sato, Matthew Coleman, Lesley ME McCowan, and Murray D. Mitchell. "Cytokine abundance in placental tissues: evidence of inflammatory activation in gestational membranes with term and preterm parturition." American Journal of Obstetrics & Gynecology 181, no. 6 (1999): 1530–1536.
- McCowan, Lesley ME, Gustaaf A. Dekker, Eliza Chan, Alistair Stewart, Lucy C. Chappell, Misty Hunter, Rona Moss-Morris, and Robyn A. North. "Spontaneous preterm birth and small for gestational age infants in women who stop smoking early in pregnancy: prospective cohort study." BMJ 338 (2009): b1081.
- Kenny, Louise C., David I. Broadhurst, Warwick Dunn, Marie Brown, Robyn A. North, Lesley McCowan, Claire Roberts, Garth JS Cooper, Douglas B. Kell, and Philip N. Baker. "Robust early pregnancy prediction of later preeclampsia using metabolomic biomarkers." Hypertension 56, no. 4 (2010): 741–749.
