= Nan Kinross =

New Zealand nursing academic (1926–2021)

Nan Kinross CBE
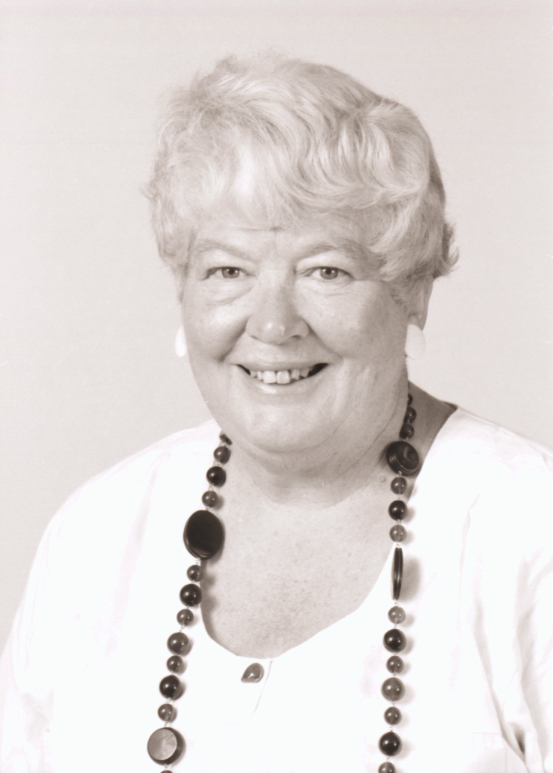
- Kinross in 1988
- Born: Nancy Joan Kinross; 30 October 1926
- Died: 17 May 2021 (aged 94); Palmerston North, New Zealand

Academic background
- Education: Canterbury University College (BA); University of California, Berkeley (MS); Massey University (PhD)

Academic work
- Discipline: Nursing
- Institutions: Massey University

Nancy Joan Kinross CBE (30 October 1926 – 17 May 2021) was a New Zealand nurse and nursing academic. In 1985, she was appointed the first professor of nursing at Massey University, and was the second female professor at the university.

== Biography ==
Born on 30 October 1926, Kinross was the daughter of Stewart and Margaret Kinross. In 1959, she graduated from Canterbury University College with a Bachelor of Arts degree.

In the early 1960s, Kinross completed a Master of Science in nursing at the University of California, Berkeley, and she then worked as supervising matron at Southland Hospital. From 1967 to 1973, Kinross was assistant director of the nursing division of the Department of Health. She was also active on the New Zealand Nurses' Association executive and national committees. With Norma Chick, Kinross introduced the first courses in nursing at Massey University in Palmerston North in 1974, and she later earned a PhD from Massey. In 1985, she was appointed the inaugural professor of nursing at Massey, becoming the second woman to receive a chair at that institution. When she retired from Massey in 1991, Kinross was conferred with the title of professor emeritus.

In the 1993 New Year Honours, Kinross was appointed a Commander of the Order of the British Empire, for services to nursing and nursing education.

Kinross died in Palmerston North on 17 May 2021, aged 94.
