= Clinical Rehabilitation =

- Discipline: Rehabilitation medicine
- Language: English
- Edited by: Derick T. Wade

Publication details
- Former names: Journal of Rehabilitation Sciences, Tijdschrift voor Revalidatiewetenschappen
- History: 1987-present
- Publisher: SAGE Publications
- Frequency: Monthly
- Impact factor: 1.772 (2010)

Standard abbreviations
- ISO 4: Clin. Rehabil.

Indexing
- CODEN: CEHAEN
- ISSN: 0269-2155 (print); 1477-0873 (web)
- OCLC no.: 42417606

Links
- Journal homepage; Online access; Online archive

Clinical Rehabilitation is a monthly peer-reviewed medical journal that publishes scholarly articles in the field of Rehabilitation medicine. The journal was established in 1987. In 1996 it incorporated the Journal of Rehabilitation Sciences (ISSN 0929-6719, from 1987-1990 known as the Tijdschrift voor Revalidatiewetenschappen, ISSN 0923-0211).

== Scope ==
Clinical rehabilitation aims to publish research articles which cover the whole field of disability and rehabilitation. The journal provides a forum for the international dissemination, discussion and exchange of information amongst professionals involved in rehabilitation.

== Abstracting and indexing ==
Clinical Rehabilitation is abstracted and indexed in Scopus and the Science Citation Index Expanded. According to the Journal Citation Reports, its 2010 impact factor is 1.772, ranking it 14th out of 43 in the category "Rehabilitation".
