= Anne Anderson (researcher) =

Scottish researcher

- Born: Anne Barbara Michie Anderson; 10 February 1937; Forres, Scotland
- Died: 11 February 1983 (aged 46)
- Occupation: Reproductive physiologist

Academic work
- Doctoral students: Lesley McCowan

Anne Barbara Michie Anderson (10 February 1937 – 11 February 1983) was a Scottish reproductive physiologist, researcher, lecturer, and author. Her major contributions were for her research in reproductive physiology. In the last decade of her life, she broadened this to encompass more about women's health generally, including doing clinical trials and working with people focusing in on what would become evidence-based medicine.

== Early life, education, early career ==
Anne Anderson was born in Forres, Scotland on 10 February 1937. She received her M.B. degree in 1960 from the University of Aberdeen and was awarded her M.D. from the same institution in 1965 for her basic science research on the birth process.

=== Work on birth process ===
Anderson moved to the Tenovus Institute in Cardiff alongside Professor Alec Turnbull with whom she had been working. In 1970, Anderson was appointed clinical lecturer in obstetrics and gynecology at the Welsh National School of Medicine. Anderson was awarded her Ph.D. in 1972, again for work focused around the birth process. When Turnbull moved to the University of Oxford in 1973, Anderson moved with him and was appointed clinical lecturer in obstetrics and gynecology. In 1978, she was appointed University Lecturer at the University and Honorary Consultant in Clinical Reproductive Physiology in the John Radcliffe Hospital, Oxford. She was also appointed a fellow of St Hilda's College, Oxford. One of Anderson's notable doctoral students is Lesley McCowan, professor of obstetrics and gynecology at the University of Auckland.

In Oxford, Anderson continued her research on the birth process in sheep and humans and also took on studies of the causes and management of preterm labor, gynecological endocrinology, menstrual disorders and infertility. Anderson started one of the first menopause clinics in Oxford, within the Nuffield Department of Obstetrics and Gynaecology, at John Radcliffe Hospital. In addition to doing her laboratory and clinical work, Anderson served on the editorial boards of the Journal of Endocrinology and the British Journal of Obstetrics and Gynaecology.

In 1980, Anderson was elected chairman of the Blair Bell Research Society, and in 1981 she was elected as a fellow of the Royal College of Obstetricians and Gynaecologists, London.

== Later work ==
Anderson had an active interest in women's health, co-editing the first edition (1983) of Women's Problems in General Practice with Ann McPherson. Anne also contributed to Effectiveness and Satisfaction in Antenatal Care (1982), edited by Murray Enkin and Iain Chalmers, and was discussing, with Marc Keirse and Iain Chalmers, the possibility of co-editing a companion volume on Effective Care in Labour and Delivery. However, Anderson's illness and premature death from breast cancer at age 46 ended her involvement. Iain Chalmers, Murray Enkin and Marc Keirse went on to publish Effective Care in Pregnancy and Childbirth (ECPC) in 1989, dedicating the book in part to Anderson. Effective Care in Pregnancy and Childbirth, through its systematic approach to assessing the research literature, is widely acknowledged to have led to development of a similar project for all of medicine and health, the Cochrane Collaboration.

== Legacy ==
The Anne Anderson Award is presented each year by the Cochrane Collaboration. Recipients are women and are selected based on emotional and cognitive intelligence, serving as an inspiration to others, evidence of cumulative accomplishment, originality and independence of thought, personal qualities, team building, leadership and mentorship. The recipient of the Anne Anderson Award receives a plaque from the Cochrane Collaboration honoring her contributions. The cash award of US$3000 is designated by the recipient to assist one woman from a low resource setting with her Cochrane Collaboration activities.
