= Canadian Journal of Occupational Therapy =

- Discipline: Occupational therapy
- Language: English, French
- Edited by: Catherine Vallée

Publication details
- History: 1933-present
- Publisher: SAGE Publications
- Frequency: 4/year
- Impact factor: 1.255 (2016)

Standard abbreviations
- ISO 4: Can. J. Occup. Ther.

Indexing
- ISSN: 0008-4174 (print); 1911-9828 (web)
- LCCN: cn79310959
- OCLC no.: 51497049

Links
- Journal homepage; Online access; Online archive

The Canadian Journal of Occupational Therapy (French title: Revue canadienne d'ergothérapie) is a peer-reviewed academic journal that covers the field of occupational therapy. The editor-in-chief is Catherine Vallée (Université Laval). It was established in 1933 and is published by SAGE Publications.

== Abstracting and indexing ==
The journal is abstracted and indexed in:

- CINAHL
- Current Contents/Clinical Medicine
- Current Contents/Social & Behavioral Sciences
- EMBASE
- MEDLINE/PubMed
- PsycINFO
- Science Citation Index Expanded
- Scopus
- Social Sciences Citation Index

According to the Journal Citation Reports, its 2016 impact factor is 1.255, ranking it 39 out of 65 journals in the category "Rehabilitation".
