= Jemaima Tiatia-Siau =

Pro-Vice Chancellor Pacific, University of Auckland in New Zealand

- Awards: Fellow of the Pacific Academy of Sciences

Academic background
- Education: University of Auckland
- Theses: The church: friend or foe for our Pacific Island youth?: a New Zealand born perspective (1997); Reasons to live : N.Z. born Samoan young people's responses to suicidal behaviours (2003)

Jemaima Tiatia-Siau is a New Zealand academic, and is a full professor at the University of Auckland specialising in Pacific Studies and mental health and wellbeing. Tiatia has studied suicide in the Pacific community in New Zealand, conducting the first national review of suicide deaths, and writing national guidelines for postvention. In 2024 Tiatia-Siau was elected a Foundation Fellow of the Pacific Academy of Sciences. She is the first Pacific woman Pro Vice-Chancellor at any New Zealand university.

== Academic career ==
Tiatia-Siau is of Samoan descent, and was born in Tokoroa and raised in West Auckland. She completed a master's thesis in 1997 at the University of Auckland, with a thesis on the relationship between the church and Pacific Island youth. Her thesis was later published by the Christian Research Association as the book Caught Between Cultures. Tiatia-Siau then completed a PhD in community health, also at Auckland, focusing on attitudes to suicide in Samoan youth. Tiatia-Siau then joined the faculty of the University of Auckland, rising to full professor in 2024. Tiatia-Siau is a Professor of Pacific Studies, and in 2022 was appointed as Pro-Vice Chancellor Pacific. She is the first Pacific woman Pro Vice-Chancellor at any New Zealand university. Tiatia-Siau also served on the Mental Health and Wellbeing Commission, established as a Crown entity after the 2018 He Ara Oranga inquiry into mental health and addiction, of which she was one of six panelists.

Tiatia-Siau's research covers suicide prevention and postvention, youth development, health and wellbeing, and climate change and mental wellbeing. Tiatia-Siau conducted the first review of suicide deaths in the New Zealand Pacific community, and then wrote national guidelines for postvention, interventions taken to reduce the likelihood of further suicidal behaviours and associated psychological impacts.

== Honours and awards ==
In 2024, Tiatia-Siau was elected a Foundation Fellow of the Pacific Academy of Sciences.

== Selected works ==
- Tiatia, J. (2008). Pacific cultural competencies: A literature review (Report). Wellington: Ministry of Health. p. 50.
- Tiatia-Seath, Jemaima; Lay Yee, Roy; Von Randow, Martin (28 April 2017). "Suicide mortality among Pacific peoples in New Zealand, 1996–2013". New Zealand Medical Journal. 130 (1454): 21–29. PMID 28449013.
- Fleming, T; Tiatia-Seath, J; Peiris-John, R; Sutcliffe, K; Archer, D; Bavin, L; Crengle, S; Clark, T (12 August 2020). Youth19 Rangatahi Smart Survey, initial findings: Hauora hinengaro/emotional and mental health (Report). New Zealand: The Youth19 Research Group, The University of Auckland and Victoria University of Wellington.
- Tiatia, J. (1998). Caught between cultures: a New Zealand-born Pacific Island perspective. Auckland, N.Z.: Christian Research Association. p. 177.
- Tasileta Teevale; Lee, A. C.; Jemaima Tiatia-Siau; Clark, Terryann Coralie; Denny, Simon; Pat Bullen; Fleming, Terry; Roshini Janet Peiris-John (2016). "Risk and Protective Factors for Suicidal Behaviors Among Pacific Youth in New Zealand". Crisis. 37 (5): 335–346. doi:10.1027/0227-5910/a000396. PMID 27278568. Wikidata Q39698700.
- Jemaima Tiatia; Fiona Langridge; Christina Newport; Underhill, Yvonne Jasmine R. Rangi Tangaroa; Woodward, Alistair Jack (2022). "Climate change, mental health and wellbeing: privileging Pacific peoples' perspectives – phase one". Climate and Development. 15 (8): 655–666. doi:10.1080/17565529.2022.2145171. Wikidata Q130638895.
- Tasileta Teevale; Lee, A. C.; Jemaima Tiatia-Siau; Clark, Terryann Coralie; Denny, Simon; Pat Bullen; Fleming, Terry; Roshini Janet Peiris-John (2016). "Risk and Protective Factors for Suicidal Behaviors Among Pacific Youth in New Zealand". Crisis. 37 (5): 335–346. doi:10.1027/0227-5910/a000396. PMID 27278568. Wikidata Q39698700.
