= Janet Fanslow =

New Zealand public health scientist

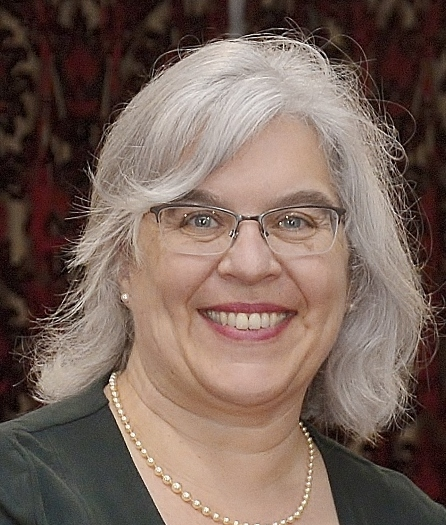
- Awards: Member of the New Zealand Order of Merit

Academic background
- Education: University of Auckland
- Theses: Sex, tags and stereotypes: a study of listener evaluations of tag question usage in female and male speech (1990); Emergency department protocols of care for women abused by partners: development, implementation and evaluation (1995)

Janet Lynn Fanslow MNZM is a New Zealand academic, and is a full professor at the University of Auckland, specialising in researching the prevention, prevalence and consequences of family violence.

== Academic career ==
Fanslow holds a bachelor's degree with Honours from Iowa State University and a Masters degree from the University of Otago. She completed a PhD titled Emergency department protocols of care for women abused by partners: development, implementation and evaluation at the University of Auckland. Fanslow undertook postdoctoral research in the Family and Intimate Violence Prevention Team of the USA Centers for Disease Control and Prevention. Fanslow joined the faculty of the Social and Community Health section of the School of Population Health at the University of Auckland in 1991. She was appointed to full professor in 2024.

Fanslow's research focuses on family violence, exploring its prevalence, consequences, and how it can be prevention, including economic, physical, and emotional abuse. Fanslow's early work encouraged the recognition of family violence as a health issue. Her work has been funded by the Health Research Council of New Zealand, and she led the 2003 and 2019 New Zealand Violence Against Women Surveys. The surveys involved interviewing nearly 3000 women. Fanslow is the Chief Advisor to the New Zealand Family Violence Clearinghouse, which collates information on family violence for practitioners.

== Honours and awards ==
In the 2018 Queen's Birthday Honours, Fanslow was appointed as a Member of the New Zealand Order of Merit, for services to the research and prevention of family violence.

== Selected works ==
- Fanslow, Janet Lynn; Robinson, Elizabeth (2009). "Help-seeking behaviors and reasons for help seeking reported by a representative sample of women victims of intimate partner violence in New Zealand". Journal of Interpersonal Violence. 25 (5): 929–951. doi:10.1177/0886260509336963. PMID 19597160. Wikidata Q84217445.
- Fanslow, Janet Lynn; Robinson, Elizabeth (2004). "Violence against women in New Zealand: prevalence and health consequences". The New Zealand Medical Journal. 117 (1206): U1173. PMID 15570342. Wikidata Q51935199.
- Fanslow, Janet Lynn; Robinson, Elizabeth; Crengle, Sue; Lana Perese (2007). "Prevalence of child sexual abuse reported by a cross-sectional sample of New Zealand women". Child Abuse & Neglect. 31 (9): 935–945. doi:10.1016/j.chiabu.2007.02.009. PMID 17875321. Wikidata Q39813790.
- Fanslow, Janet Lynn; Robinson, Elizabeth; Crengle, Sue; Lana Perese (2010). "Juxtaposing beliefs and reality: prevalence rates of intimate partner violence and attitudes to violence and gender roles reported by New Zealand women". Violence Against Women. 16 (7): 812–831. doi:10.1177/1077801210373710. PMID 20558771. Wikidata Q47381467.
- Fanslow, Janet Lynn; Norton, Robyn Ngaire; Spinola CG (1998). "Indicators of assault-related injuries among women presenting to the emergency department". Annals of Emergency Medicine. 32 (3 Pt 1): 341–348. doi:10.1016/s0196-0644(98)70011-3. PMID 9737497. Wikidata Q44720174.
- Fanslow, Janet Lynn; Martha Silva; Anna Whitehead; Robinson, Elizabeth (2008). "Pregnancy outcomes and intimate partner violence in New Zealand". Australian and New Zealand Journal of Obstetrics and Gynaecology. 48 (4): 391–397. doi:10.1111/j.1479-828x.2008.00866.x. PMID 18837845. Wikidata Q45766480.
- Fanslow, Janet Lynn; Anna Whitehead; Martha Silva; Robinson, Elizabeth (2008). "Contraceptive use and associations with intimate partner violence among a population-based sample of New Zealand women". Australian and New Zealand Journal of Obstetrics and Gynaecology. 48 (1): 83–89. doi:10.1111/j.1479-828x.2007.00805.x. PMID 18275577. Wikidata Q39834589.
