= Terryann Clark =

Professor of mental health nursing

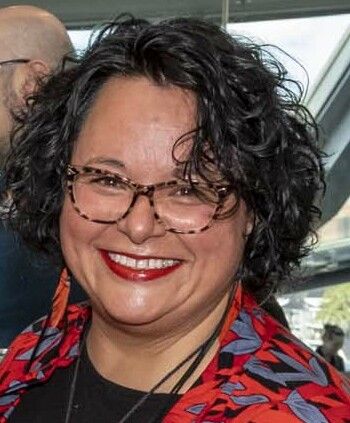
- Clark in 2023
- Born: Terryann Coralie Clark
- Awards: Research Impact Award 2022

Academic background
- Education: University of Auckland, University of Minnesota
- Thesis: Factors associated with reduced depression and suicide risk among Māori high school student in New Zealand. (2007)

Terryann Coralie Clark, known as TC, is a New Zealand Māori nursing academic, and as of 2023 is a full professor at the University of Auckland, specialising in Māori health, adolescent wellbeing and mental and sexual health.

== Biography ==
Clark grew up in Moerewa. Her mother was a child of a closed adoption, and so Clark is only recently discovering her whakapapa. Her mother's adopted whānau are Ngāpuhi Nui Tonu. Clark was educated at Otiria Primary School and Bay of Islands College. She originally wanted to be an artist, although a school guidance counsellor suggested hairdressing. Clark didn't know anyone who had been to university. Her art teacher took her to the university in Auckland during a school trip, where she "thought the students didn't look that smart." Having passed Bursary, she applied for teaching, nursing, and art courses, and at her mother's suggestion, she pursued nursing at Manukau Institute of Technology. She worked as a Māori community health worker in Glen Innes and then at Auckland Sexual Health Services.

Clark completed a Master's in Public Health at the University of Auckland in 2002, with a thesis on sexual health in young Māori people. After making contacts during a conference in Los Angeles, she completed a PhD titled Factors associated with reduced depression and suicide risk among Māori high school student in New Zealand at the University of Minnesota. In 2008, she joined the faculty of the school of nursing at the University of Auckland as a senior lecturer. She was appointed to the Cure Kids professorial chair in Child and Adolescent Mental Health in July 2022.

Her research focuses on sexual and mental health, Māori health, and especially adolescent health. She is a founding member of the Adolescent Health Research Group, and has been part of collecting data on a long-term study of adolescents in 2001, 2007, 2012, and 2019. Clark is on the advisory panel for the 'A Better Start' National Science Challenge.

Clark has a prosthetic leg after being hit by a car in Minnesota. She credits taking up dog-sledding with helping with her recovery.

== Awards ==
Clark and her team of won a University of Auckland Research Impact award in 2022, for their work "surveying the health and well-being of more than 36,000 teenagers [which] has provided a rich source of policy change for the better".

== Selected works ==
- Clark, Terryann Coralie; Mathijs F G Lucassen; Pat Bullen; Simon J Denny; Fleming, Terry; Elizabeth M Robinson; Fiona V Rossen (2014). "The health and well-being of transgender high school students: results from the New Zealand adolescent health survey (Youth'12)". Journal of Adolescent Health. 55 (1): 93–99. doi:10.1016/j.jadohealth.2013.11.008. PMID 24438852. Wikidata Q34398674.
- Crengle, Sue; Robinson, Elizabeth; Ameratunga, Shanthi Neranjana; Clark, Terryann Coralie; Raphael, Deborah (2012). "Ethnic discrimination prevalence and associations with health outcomes: data from a nationally representative cross-sectional survey of secondary school students in New Zealand". BMC Public Health. 12: 45. doi:10.1186/1471-2458-12-45. PMC 3315751. PMID 22257643. Wikidata Q34132449.
- Simon Denny; Clark, Terryann Coralie; Terry Fleming; Melanie Wall (2004). "Emotional resilience: risk and protective factors for depression among alternative education students in New Zealand". American Journal of Orthopsychiatry. 74 (2): 137–149. doi:10.1037/0002-9432.74.2.137. PMID 15113243. Wikidata Q39266964.
- Fleming, Terry; Clark, Terryann Coralie; Denny, Simon; Pat Bullen; Crengle, Sue; Roshini J Peiris-John; Robinson, Elizabeth; Fiona V Rossen; Sheridan, Janie; Mathijs Lucassen (2013). "Stability and change in the mental health of New Zealand secondary school students 2007-2012: results from the national adolescent health surveys". Australian and New Zealand Journal of Psychiatry. 48 (5): 472–480. doi:10.1177/0004867413514489. PMID 24317154. Wikidata Q47946701.
- Clark, Terryann Coralie; Fleming, Terry; Pat Bullen; Crengle, Sue; Denny, Simon; Ben Dyson; Roshini J Peiris-John; Robinson, Elizabeth; Fiona Rossen; Sheridan, Janie; Tasileta Teevale; Jennifer Utter; Sonia Lewycka (2013). "Health and well-being of secondary school students in New Zealand: trends between 2001, 2007 and 2012". Journal of Paediatrics and Child Health. 49 (11): 925–934. doi:10.1111/jpc.12427. PMID 24251658. Wikidata Q39312147.
