= Tasileta Teevale =

Samoan New Zealand public health researcher

Tasileta Teevale MNZM
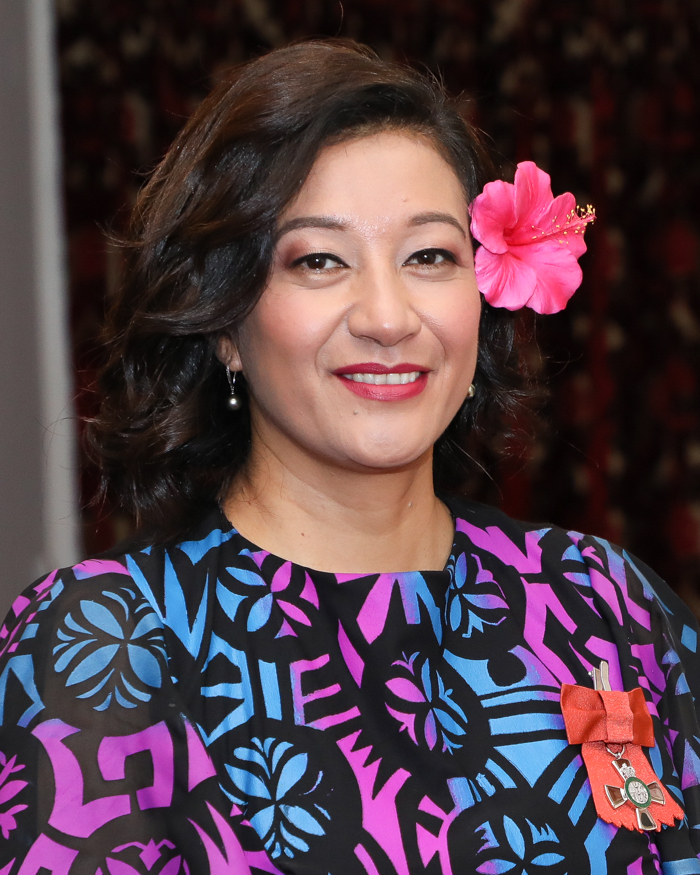
- Teevale in 2021
- Born: 22 March 1973; Apia, Samoa
- Died: 21 April 2023 (aged 50); Dunedin, New Zealand

Academic background
- Education: University of Auckland, Massey University, University of Otago
- Theses: Pacific women's netball participation in Aotearoa/New Zealand: factors influencing participation (2001); Obesity in Pacific adolescents: a socio-cultural study in Auckland, New Zealand (2009)
- Doctoral advisor: David R Thomas, Robert Scragg, Vili Nosa

Academic work
- Institutions: University of Otago, Universal College of Learning, Tertiary Education Commission

Tasileta "Leta" Teevale MNZM (22 March 1973 – 21 April 2023) was a Samoan New Zealand academic, and was the inaugural director of the Pacific Development Office at the University of Otago. In 2021, she was appointed a Member of the New Zealand Order of Merit, for services to Pacific education and public health research.

== Early life and education ==
Teevale was born in Apia, Samoa, to Reverend Fuifui Teevale and Roberta Leisam-Teevale, and was the second of four children. When Teevale was eight years old, her father earned a scholarship to study at the University of Otago and the family moved to Dunedin in New Zealand. Teevale first attended Opoho School, where she learned English, and later went to Brockville Primary School, Kenmure Intermediate and Kaikorai Valley College. The family moved to Christchurch when Teevale's father graduated, and she finished her schooling at Hillmorton High School. Teevale discovered a love of volleyball at high school, and was in the team at Hillmorton that won the secondary school nationals.

== Academic career ==
Teevale completed a Bachelor of Physical Education degree at the University of Otago, after which she lectured in exercise science at the Universal College of Learning in Palmerston North. She then undertook a Master of Business Studies in Sports Management at Massey University, and worked for the Tertiary Education Commission first as a regional advisor and then as a national advisor in the Research Evaluation Unit. Teevale completed a PhD titled Obesity in Pacific adolescents: a socio-cultural study in Auckland, New Zealand at the University of Auckland in 2009, followed by postdoctoral research in Auckland's School of Population Health. Teevale then joined the faculty of the University of Otago, being appointed as the first Director of the Pacific Development Office in 2013. She was responsible for monitoring the university's delivery on its Pacific Strategic Framework, and established a number of Pacific groups and roles throughout the university, such as divisional Associate Dean Pacific, the University of Otago Pacific Islands Students' Association, and a Pacific Leadership Group.

Teevale's research covered physical education, health, youth and topics such as investigating the barriers to Pacific educational achievement at university. She carried out a national survey of youth health and wellbeing, and a study of school-based interventions to manage weight.

In 2022, Teevale was diagnosed with cancer, and she died in Dunedin on 21 April 2023.

== Honours and awards ==
In the 2021 New Years Honours Teevale was appointed a Member of the New Zealand Order of Merit for services to Pacific education and public health research.

== Selected works ==
- Clark, Terryann Coralie; Fleming, Terry; Bullen, Pat; et al. (2013). "Health and well-being of secondary school students in New Zealand: trends between 2001, 2007 and 2012". Journal of Paediatrics and Child Health. 49 (11): 925–934. doi:10.1111/jpc.12427. PMID 24251658. Wikidata Q39312147.
- Aminzadeh, Kaveh; Denny, Simon; Utter, Jennifer; Milfont, Taciano; Ameratunga, Shanthi Neranjana; Teevale, Tasileta; Clark, Terryann Coralie (2013). "Neighbourhood social capital and adolescent self-reported wellbeing in New Zealand: a multilevel analysis". Social Science & Medicine. 84: 13–21. doi:10.1016/j.socscimed.2013.02.012. PMID 23517699. Wikidata Q48274752. (Erratum: doi:10.1016/j.socscimed.2013.05.017, Wikidata Q59168015)
- Nicki Jackson; Denny, Simon; Sheridan, Janie; Fleming, Terry; Clark, Terryann Coralie; Teevale, Tasileta; Ameratunga, Shanthi Neranjana (2013). "Predictors of drinking patterns in adolescence: a latent class analysis". Drug and Alcohol Dependence. 135: 133–139. doi:10.1016/j.drugalcdep.2013.11.021. PMID 24373625. Wikidata Q50738661.
- Denny, Simon; Lewycka, Sonia; Utter, Jennifer; et al. (2016). "The association between socioeconomic deprivation and secondary school students' health: findings from a latent class analysis of a national adolescent health survey". International Journal for Equity in Health. 15 (1): 109. doi:10.1186/s12939-016-0398-5. PMC 4947270. PMID 27422160. Wikidata Q37099748.
- Clíona Ní Mhurchú; Eyles, Helen; Dixon, Robyn; Leonie Matoe; Teevale, Tasileta; Patricia Meagher-Lundberg (2011). "Economic incentives to promote healthier food purchases: exploring acceptability and key factors for success". Health Promotion International. 27 (3): 331–341. doi:10.1093/heapro/dar042. PMID 21742702. Wikidata Q48124529.
