= Youth suicide =

Suicide of a young person

Youth suicide is when a young person, generally categorized as someone below the legal age of majority, deliberately ends their own life. Rates of youth suicide and attempted youth suicide in Western societies and elsewhere are high. Female youth are more likely to attempt suicide than male youth but less likely to die from their attempt. In Australia, suicide is second only to traffic collisions as a cause of death for adolescents and young adults aged 15 to 25.

In the United States, according to the National Institute of Mental Health, suicide is the second leading cause of death for adolescents between the ages of 10 and 14, and the third leading cause of death for those between 15 and 19. In 2021, the American Academy of Pediatrics, the American Academy of ChiId and Adolescent Psychiatry, and the Children's Hospital Association released a joint statement announcing a mental health crisis among American youth. Emergency room visits for mental health issues have dramatically increased, especially since the start of the COVID-19 pandemic.

Mental health education in schools equips students with the knowledge and skills to recognise signs of distress and seek help. Community support programs offer safe spaces for adolescents to express their emotions and receive professional support. Increased access to mental health resources, including hotlines and counseling services, ensures timely intervention and support for at-risk youths. These initiatives aim to address the underlying factors contributing to youth suicide and promote mental well-being among adolescents.

== Suicide contagion ==
According to research conducted by the Commission for Children and Young People and Child Guardian in 2007, 39% of all young people who die by suicide had someone of influence or significance who died by suicide. The commission terms this suicide contagion and makes several recommendations as to the importance of safeguarding young people and communities from suicide contagion. This phenomenon highlights the ripple effect of suicide within communities and its impact on vulnerable individuals. When a group of suicides happen around the same time, it is called clustering. More than 13% of the suicides that happen in adolescents can be explained by clustering.

In 2011, the Australian Federal Parliament Standing Committee for Health and Ageing Inquiry into Youth Suicide met in a round table forum with young representatives from three organizations at the forefront of preventing youth suicide. These organizations included Sunnykids, Inspire, and Boys Town. The Standing Committee has since released a discussion paper highlighting the findings of their inquiry and will seek to make final recommendations on the most effective means for reducing youth suicide.

Strategies for preventing suicide contagion encompass a range of approaches, from media guidelines to community interventions and support for bereaved individuals. Mental health professionals emphasize the importance of responsible media reporting to minimize sensationalization and the risk of contagion. Community-based interventions, such as peer support groups and mental health education programs, play a crucial role in promoting resilience and connectedness among vulnerable populations. Policymakers collaborate with experts to develop comprehensive strategies aimed at reducing the spread of suicidal behavior and supporting those affected by a suicidal death.

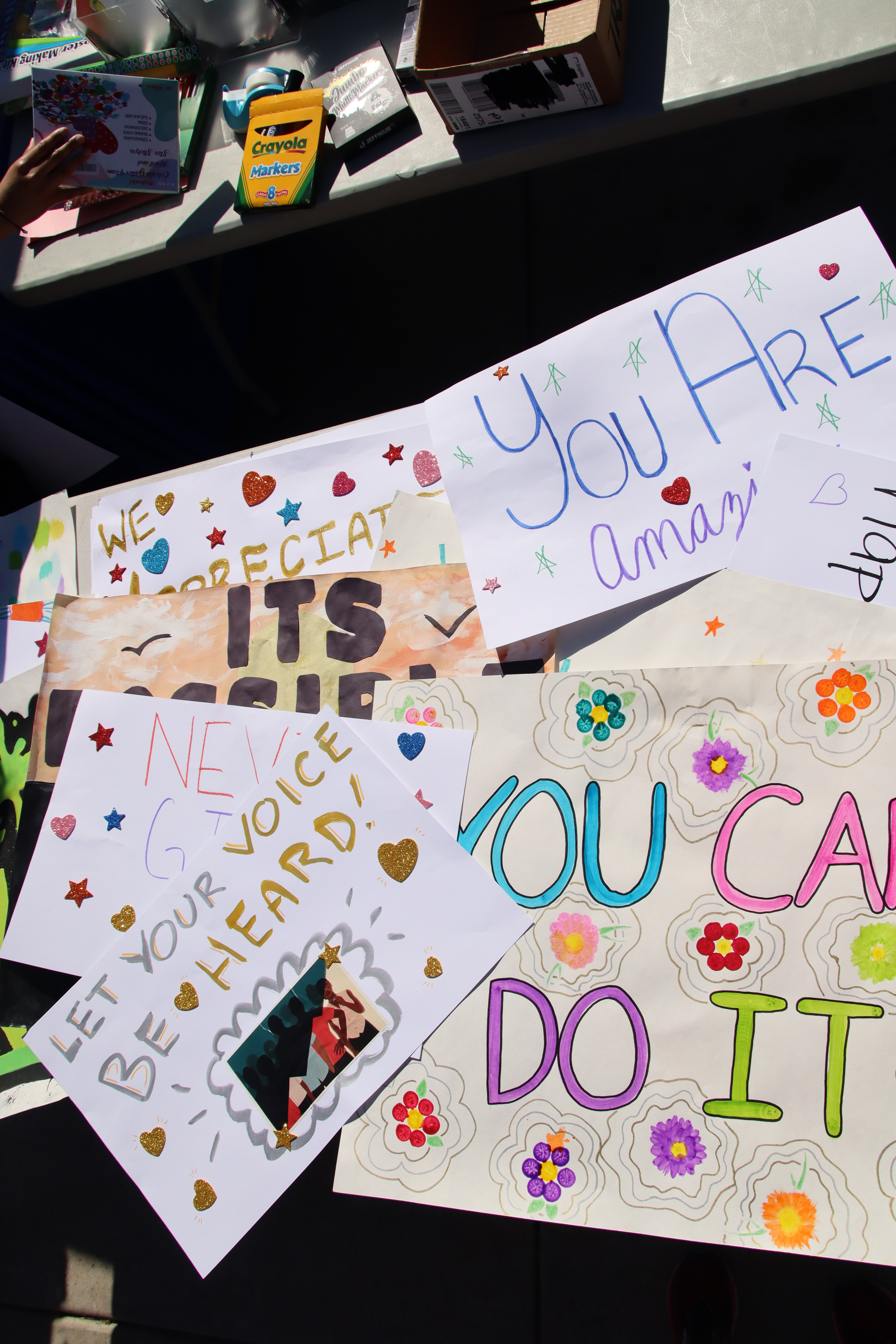
The image provides a visual reinforcement of the importance of safeguarding young people and communities from suicide contagion. It conveys a message of hope and support, which aligns with the theme of resilience and prevention highlighted in the article.

=== Teens at risk ===
There are a range of risk and protective factors for youth suicide that are multidimensional and complex. Risk factors include mental health conditions, adverse childhood experiences such as abuse or violence, bullying, substance use, economic instability, family conflict, and more. Protective factors include having family support, a sense of purpose and belonging, and having safe environments with access to effective mental health care and without access to lethal means of suicide.

One of the problems facing teenagers at risk of suicide is getting psychiatric counselling when it is needed. Research from 2020 shows that compared with older adolescents, younger adolescents particularly agree that increased cyberbullying and despair are very important factors influencing suicide among adolescents.

Access to psychiatric counseling remains a critical issue for teenagers at risk of suicide. Research from early 2020 underscores the significance of cyberbullying and its impact on adolescent mental health. Younger adolescents, in particular, acknowledge the correlation between increased cyberbullying and feelings of despair, which are recognized as significant contributors to suicidal ideation among youths. To address these risk factors effectively, evidence-based interventions and strategies have been implemented. School-based mental health programs offer education and support to students, fostering resilience and coping skills to navigate challenges such as cyberbullying. Support groups provide a safe space for adolescents to share experiences and receive peer support, reducing feelings of isolation and promoting emotional well-being.

Suicide risk is higher in those experiencing forms of adversity, including food insecurity, which can often lead to stigma, social isolation, shame, sadness and family strain. Suicidal ideation, suicide planning and suicide attempts are also more prevalent in adolescents struggling with food insecurity than those who are food-secure. This is more common in countries where adolescent food insecurity is rare, potentially because it indicates a reduced standard of living and low social standing within that country.

Harassment is a leading cause of teen suicide, along with abuse. Gay teens or those unsure of their sexual identity are more likely to die by suicide, particularly if they have suffered bullying or harassment. Several campaigns have been started in hopes of giving teens hope and abolishing the feeling of isolation. Specific studies have explored the link between harassment and suicide among LGBTQ+ youth, highlighting the detrimental effects of bullying and harassment on mental health and well-being.

Initiatives such as It Gets Better, Born This Way, I Get Bullied Too, and Stop Youth Suicide aim to provide support and encouragement to vulnerable youth, using varying approaches.

Lack of impulse control has been found to differentiate adolescent suicide attempters from a control group of adolescents with an acute illness (Slap, Vorters, Chaudhuri, & Centor, 1988). However, impulsivity does not characterize all suicide attempters, since group comparisons have found no differences between suicidal patients and psychiatric controls on a measure of cognitive impulsivity (Patsiokas, Clum, & Luscomb, 1979). Instead, impulsivity may be important in identifying high-risk subgroups.

=== Sexual minority youth and suicide ===
Youth that fall under the category of sexual minorities are at an elevated risk of depression and succumbing to self-harm. Research indicates that sexual minority youth are at increased risk of experiencing mental health issues compared to their heterosexual peers. Among the population of sexual minority youth, 28% say they have experienced suicidal actions or thoughts. Studies have also shown that this is due to "perceived burdensomeness, low sense of belonging, and acquired ability to enact lethal self injury". Lesbian and gay youth are the group most likely to face negative experiences, leading to a higher likelihood of the development of suicidal thoughts according to mental care professionals. Additionally, bisexual youth face an even higher likelihood of suicidality, with reports indicating that they are five times more likely to report suicidal thoughts and actions. Bisexuality also carries a higher likelihood of suicidality with bisexuals being five times more likely to report suicidal thoughts and actions. Sexual minority youth also report a higher incidence of substance abuse when compared to heterosexuals. Overall, studies suggest that sexual minority youth carry a higher incidence of suicide and depression, and that reforms centered on alleviating minority stigma attenuate this disparity.

=== Black youth suicide ===
While the overall youth suicide rate has been declining, Black youth suicide rose 144% between 2007 and 2020. Black youth ages 5–12 were almost twice as likely to die by suicide than their White counterparts, and Black youth ages 14–18 had a higher rate of suicide attempts than White and Hispanic youth. Black youth are less likely to receive mental health treatment compared to their white counterparts and less likely to use crisis hotlines. Healthcare disparities between Black and white families play a significant role in this situation. Black families are more likely to face barriers such as inadequate insurance coverage, long wait times for care, and a shortage of Black mental health professionals who can provide culturally responsive therapy. This may discourage the individual from seeking out the mental health care they need in times of crisis. Similarly, Black individuals are more likely to distrust healthcare systems and have concerns about law enforcement involvement during a mental health crisis than their white counterparts. In times of mental health crisis, the individual looks for resources that are trusted and helpful, not ones that they fear may cause further repercussions.

=== Previous exposure, attempts, and age impacting youth suicide ===
Exposure to suicide, previous attempts of suicide, and age are some of the most influential factors of young individuals and their probability of dying by suicide. Adolescent exposure to suicide through classmates has caused researchers to hypothesize suicide as a contagion. They note how a child's exposure to suicide predicts suicidal ideation and attempts. Previous exposure to suicide through parental attempts have also been found to have a 3.5% increase in a youth's probability of having suicidal thoughts, with a 2.6% increased chance of them attempting suicide. Aggression in families and its transference can be one of the main causes of transmission of suicidal tendencies in families.

Previous attempts of suicide also play a major role in a youth attempting suicide again. On average, it has been recorded that the follow-up period for suicide-attempters was 3.88 years. Evidence shows those most at risk for suicide are those who previously attempted suicide, with research showing that they can have anywhere from a 40 to over a 100 times higher chance of dying by suicide compared to the general population.

On average, it has been recorded that the follow-up period for suicide-attempters was 3.88 years. Evidence shows those most at risk for suicide are those who previously attempted suicide, with research showing that they can have anywhere from a 40 to over a 100 times higher chance of dying by suicide compared to the general population.

Age and experience also factor in suicide. It has been found that older, more experienced populations take more time to plan, choose deadlier methods, and have greater suicidal intent. This results in them eventually committing suicide at a higher rate than their younger counterparts. A US nationwide study of adolescent suicides found increasing rates of firearm, poisoning, and hanging and asphyxiation suicides among American Indian and Alaska Native, Black, and Asian and Pacific Islander youth from 1999 to 2020.

The International Association for Suicide Prevention looked at multiple different studies and accessed them based on what it being done and how successful certain methods are when it comes to suicide. When people received care from people such as (nurses, psychologists, or social workers) the rates of suicide depressed substantially. This is due to the fact that they received different resources and treatments such as psychotherapy that helped them with their depression. The Improving Mood-Promoting Access to Collaborative Treatment (IMPACT) is an example of a program that raises awareness to youth suicide. Those in this group experienced a greater quality of life, lower rates of depression, and suicidal ideation. Some key aspects of this program is the development of a therapeutic alliance, a personalized treatment plan that includes a patient's preferences, and proactive follow ups. Sometimes following up and going through these treatments can be a long process or even expensive which is why this study also explains how successful telephone counseling is as well. This type of intervention has been statistically proven to be successful.

=== Bereavement among young people ===
The primary goals of suicide postvention include assisting the survivors of suicide with the grief process, along with identifying and referring those survivors who may be at risk for negative outcomes such as depressive and anxiety disorders, and suicidal behavior. Experts in mental health stress the importance of postvention as a critical component of suicide prevention. Dr. Jane Smith, a leading psychologist specializing in grief counseling, explains, "Postvention is not only about helping survivors heal; it's also a proactive approach to prevent further tragedies. By closely supporting and monitoring those affected by a suicide, we can identify early signs of distress and intervene before another crisis occurs." This approach underscores the dual purpose of postvention, alleviating immediate grief and preventing future incidents by offering targeted support and resources. With 42% of youth suicides being suicide bereavement (or contagion) related, further research and investment must be made into supporting this group of people. A few suggestions to make sure the support is effective include making the individuals feel connected and understood.

== Epidemiology ==
Mental health is one of the largest causes of suicide and suicidal behaviors. Many people who have experienced trauma and abuse, result in struggles with mental health.

The National Institution of Health depicts the most common types of mental illness. These include panic disorders, phobias, social anxiety disorder, OCD, PTSD, GAD, and depression.

Two possible determinants to suicide attempts are lifetime sexual abuse and adult physical violence. Among participants aged 18–25, the odds ratios for lifetime sexual abuse and adult physical violence are 4.27 and 3.85, respectively. In other words, those who died by suicide are 327% more likely to have experienced lifetime sexual assault. Similarly, a suicide victim is 285% more likely to have suffered physical violence as an adult. Based on a survey done on American high school students, 16% reported considering suicide and 8% reported attempting suicide sometime within the 12 months before taking the survey. Between 1980 and 1994, the suicide rates of young black males doubled. American Indians and Alaska Natives die by suicide at a higher rate than any other ethnic group in the United States. In India, one-third of suicides are young people 15–29. In 2002, 154,000 suicides were recorded in India. In the United States, about 60 percent of suicides are carried out with a gun. In these states with stronger gun laws the rates of gun suicide among ages 10–24 was lower in 2022 than in 1999. Some Aboriginal teens and gay or lesbian teens are at high risk, depending on their community and their own self-esteem. Several campaigns have been started to give them hope and help them to feel less isolated.

The 2019 Youth Risk Behavior Survey, which the CDC conducted, found that between 2009 and 2018, suicide rates among adolescents aged 14–18 years increased by 61.7%. Furthermore, the CDC reported that in 2019, among American adolescents in grades 9 to 12:

- 18.8% of students reported seriously considering attempting suicide
- 15.7% of students made a suicide plan
- 8.9% of students attempted suicide

== Intervention ==
One organization in Australia has found that young people who feel connected, supported, and understood are less likely to die by suicide. It is understood that many young people who struggle with suicidal thoughts and behaviors often feel alone or like nobody understands how they feel, so it is extremely important to make them feel connected with their community. The National Center for Biotech Information explains that "Multiple meta-regression analyses were conducted to explore the influence of school connectedness" giving results that show the more connected peers are, the lower the risk is of suicidal thoughts and behaviors. "LGBTQ youth who report having at least one accepting adult were 40% less likely to report a suicide attempt in the past year, Over one quarter of LGBTQ youth who did not have at least one supporting or accepting adult in their life (over 17%) reported attempting suicide in the past year." The COVID-19 pandemic has likely exacerbated these situations for LGBTQ youth.

Reports on the attitudes of young people identified as at risk of suicide have been released. Such reports support the notion that connectedness, a sense of being supported and respected, is a protective factor for young people at risk of suicide. According to Pueblo Suicide Prevention Center (PSPC) for some reason children are experiencing more pressure in recent years.

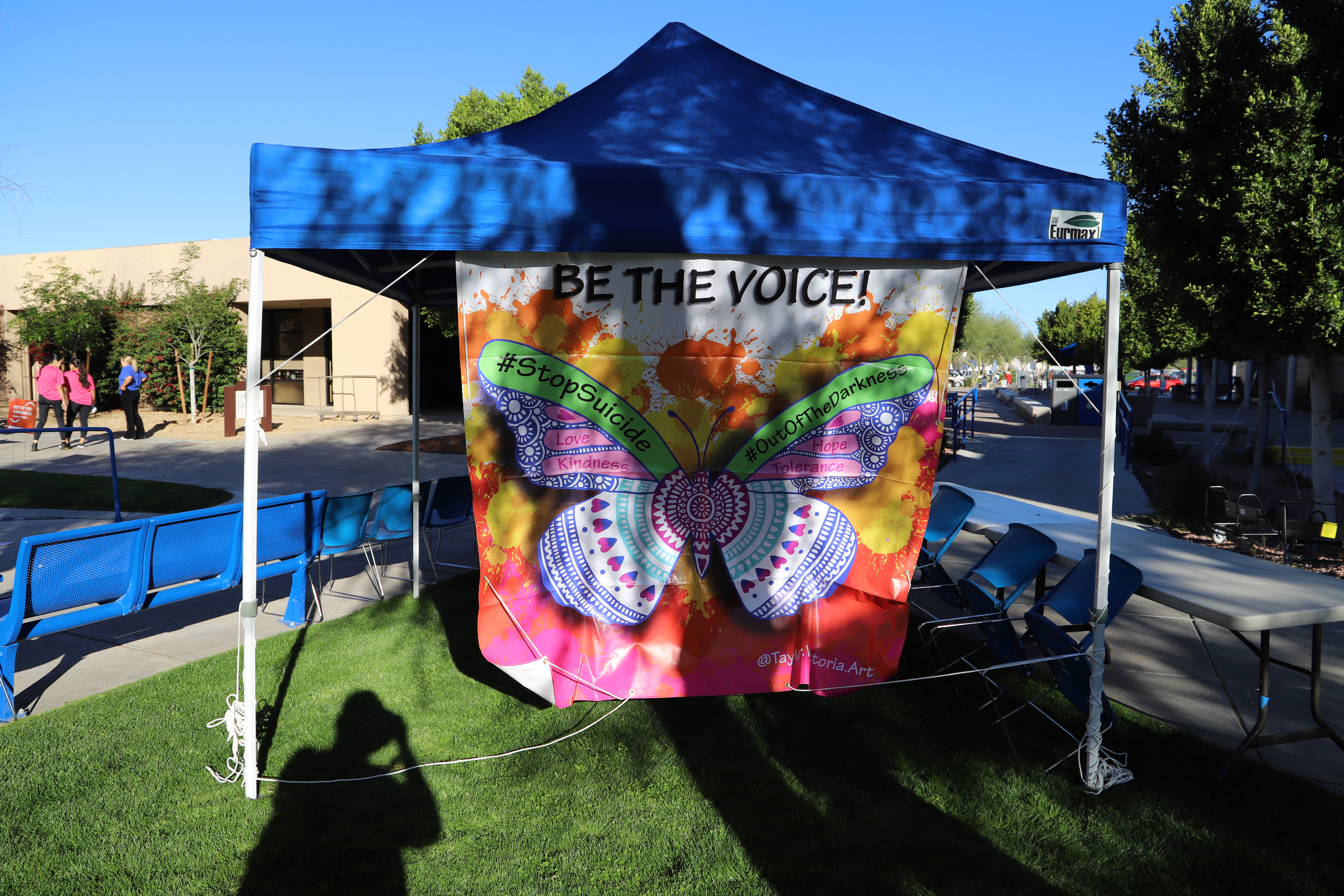
Events that bring people together for the cause can be very impactful for awareness and connection.

=== Issues for communities ===
Intervention issues for communities to address include suicide contagion, developmental understanding of suicide, development and suicide risk, and the influence of culture. Implement responsible media reporting guidelines to minimize sensationalization of suicide, train gatekeepers (such as teachers, healthcare providers, and community leaders) to recognize and respond to warning signs, and promote positive coping mechanisms and help-seeking behaviors.

Mental health issues and the effects of it can be highly contagious between others, and the National Institutes of health calls it an "infectious disease". This comes from when a person is around and interacts with and this can highly affect people and can generate real feelings of mental illness.

Key matters in postvention responses for young people include: community context, life stage relevance of responses, identification, and referral (Postvention Co-ordination), developing a suite of services, and creating ongoing options. By addressing these key matters in postvention responses for young people, communities can provide effective support and promote healing in the aftermath of a suicide. Collaboration, cultural sensitivity, and a focus on the unique needs of young people are essential for developing comprehensive and sustainable postvention strategies.

== Prevention ==
Crisis hotlines, such as the Suicide and Crisis Lifeline, enable people to get immediate emergency telephone counselling.

Youth suicide prevention requires a comprehensive approach that addresses a range of risk and protective factors, including reducing access to lethal means of suicide, increasing help-seeking and access to effective mental health and crisis care, building connectedness and life skills, and having effective postvention and crisis intervention systems.

One can help prevent adolescent suicide by discouraging isolation, addressing a child's depression which is correlated with suicide, removing any objects that a child could use to attempt suicide, and simply paying attention to what the child does or feels. Schools can also play an important part by encouraging adolescents to engage in social activities and fostering a sense of belonging, helping to prevent or lessen feelings of isolation.

Incorporating suicide prevention education into the school curriculum can increase awareness, reduce stigma, and provide students with the knowledge and skills to recognize warning signs in themselves and their peers. Age-appropriate discussions about mental health, coping strategies, and help-seeking behaviors can be integrated into various subjects or delivered through specialized programs.

When students think that they are unsafe or unaccepted it is often due to bullying from other students, not necessarily the school itself (although the kinds of environments fostered by schools can also contribute). Implementing strict policies regarding bullying or harassment would greatly benefit students because victims are more likely to consider suicide due to a lack of support from schools and adults.

As food insecurity contributes to suicidal thoughts and behaviour in adolescents, targeting this social disadvantage could be an important part of suicide prevention, particularly in countries where food insecurity is uncommon.

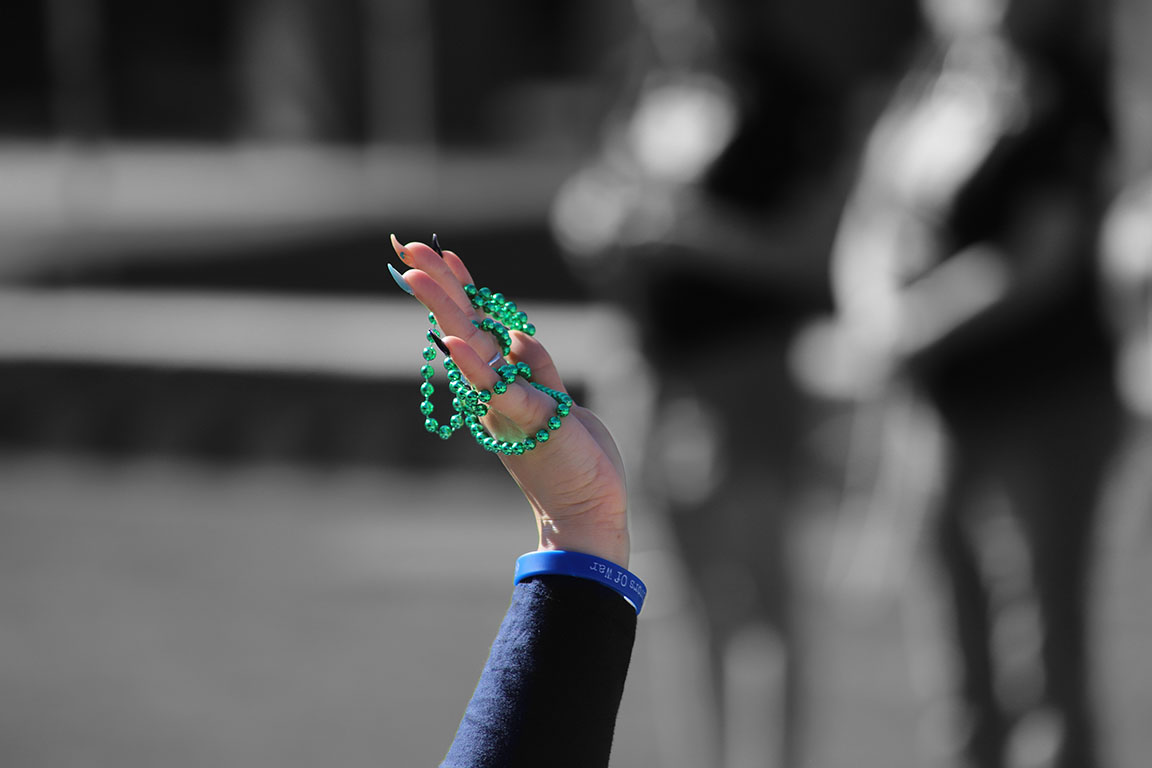
Green beads represents a person struggle or attempt

Suicide Prevention Resource Center provides professional information and resources on suicide prevention.

Prevention resources for parents, guardians, social workers, teachers, school staff, peers:

- Sibshops
- Youth Mental Health First Aid
- More can be found on U.S. Department of Health & Human Services website for Mental Health in Adolescent

National Suicide Prevention Lifeline for Youth provides resources and information for teens and adolescents such as:

- The Trevor Project
- You Matter
- StopBullying.gov
- Love is Respect
- Ditch the Label

== Table of youth suicide rates (per 100,000) ==
| Country | Year of Data | Rate of Males | Rate of Females | Total |
|---|---|---|---|---|
| Sri Lanka | 1986 | 43.9 | 49.3 | 46.5 |
| Lithuania | 2002 | 38.4 | 8.8 | 23.9 |
| Russian Federation | 2002 | 38.5 | 8.3 | 23.6 |
| Kazakhstan | 2002 | 31.2 | 10.5 | 21.0 |
| Luxembourg | 2002 | 23.5 | 8.2 | 16.0 |
| New Zealand | 2000 | 22.3 | 8.2 | 15.3 |
| El Salvador | 1993 | 13.2 | 15.8 | 14.5 |
| Belarus | 2001 | 23.6 | 3.9 | 14.0 |
| Estonia | 2002 | 24.1 | 1.9 | 13.2 |
| Turkmenistan | 1998 | 16.6 | 8.8 | 12.8 |
| Ukraine | 2000 | 19.6 | 4.9 | 12.4 |
| Ireland | 2000 | 19.8 | 4.3 | 12.3 |
| Mauritius | 2000 | 10.1 | 12.5 | 11.3 |
| Norway | 2001 | 15.3 | 6.2 | 10.9 |
| Canada | 2000 | 16.3 | 5.2 | 10.8 |
| Latvia | 2002 | 16.9 | 4.4 | 10.8 |
| Kyrgyzstan | 2002 | 15.2 | 4.8 | 10.0 |
| Austria | 2002 | 15.1 | 3.8 | 9.6 |
| Trinidad and Tobago | 1994 | 8.9 | 10.5 | 9.6 |
| Finland | 2002 | 15.0 | 3.8 | 9.5 |
| Uzbekistan | 2000 | 12.5 | 6.4 | 9.5 |
| Belgium | 1997 | 14.5 | 3.9 | 9.3 |
| Cuba | 1996 | 6.1 | 12.5 | 9.2 |
| Ecuador | 1991 | 6.9 | 11.4 | 9.1 |
| Australia | 2001 | 13.8 | 3.8 | 8.9 |
| Singapore | 2001 | 9.2 | 7.8 | 8.5 |
| Poland | 2001 | 14.1 | 2.4 | 8.4 |
| Switzerland | 2000 | 12.6 | 4.0 | 8.4 |
| Croatia | 2002 | 14.0 | 2.1 | 8.2 |
| US | 2000 | 13.0 | 2.7 | 8.0 |
| Slovenia | 1987 | 12.0 | 3.1 | 7.6 |
| Hungary | 2002 | 11.2 | 3.8 | 7.5 |
| Japan | 2000 | 8.8 | 3.8 | 6.4 |
| Uruguay | 1990 | 8.3 | 3.9 | 6.2 |
| Bulgaria | 2002 | 9.2 | 2.3 | 5.8 |
| Czech Republic | 2001 | 9.5 | 1.8 | 5.7 |
| Argentina | 1996 | 7.1 | 4.0 | 5.6 |
| Costa Rica | 1995 | 7.1 | 4.0 | 5.6 |
| Germany | 2001 | 8.7 | 2.4 | 5.6 |
| Thailand | 1994 | 6.1 | 5.1 | 5.6 |
| Colombia | 1994 | 6.7 | 4.2 | 5.5 |
| Venezuela | 1994 | 7.1 | 3.8 | 5.5 |
| Republic of Korea | 2001 | 5.9 | 4.9 | 5.4 |
| Hong Kong | 1999 | 5.1 | 5.3 | 5.2 |
| France | 1999 | 7.5 | 2.5 | 5.0 |
| Denmark | 1999 | 9.0 | 0.7 | 4.9 |
| Israel | 1999 | 8.7 | 0.0 | 4.9 |
| Romania | 2002 | 7.0 | 2.2 | 4.7 |
| Netherlands | 2000 | 7.4 | 1.8 | 4.6 |
| Sweden | 2001 | 5.7 | 2.8 | 4.3 |
| Brazil* | 1995 | 5.7 | 2.6 | 4.2 |
| Puerto Rico | 1992 | 8.3 | 0.0 | 4.2 |
| United Kingdom | 1999 | 6.5 | 1.8 | 4.2 |
| Republic of Moldova | 2002 | 7.1 | 1.1 | 4.1 |
| China* | 1999 | 3.2 | 4.8 | 4.0 |
| Slovakia | 2002 | 5.8 | 1.9 | 3.9 |
| Chile | 1994 | 6.2 | 1.3 | 3.8 |
| Mexico | 1995 | 5.1 | 2.3 | 3.7 |
| Spain | 2000 | 5.3 | 1.4 | 3.4 |
| Panama | 1987 | 4.6 | 1.6 | 3.1 |
| Albania | 2001 | 2.8 | 3.3 | 3.0 |
| Dominican Republic | 1985 | 2.7 | 3.2 | 2.9 |
| Italy | 2000 | 3.6 | 1.7 | 2.7 |
| Macedonia | 2000 | 1.2 | 3.7 | 2.4 |
| Tajikistan | 1999 | 3.3 | 0.9 | 2.1 |
| Portugal | 2000 | 2.6 | 0.9 | 1.8 |
| Greece | 1999 | 2.7 | 0.6 | 1.7 |
| Peru | 1983 | 1.3 | 0.7 | 1.0 |

Information taken from World Psychiatry, the official journal of the World Psychiatric Association. Numbers are per 100,000.

== See also ==
- Suicide among LGBTQ people
- Depression in childhood and adolescence
- List of suicides attributed to bullying
- Youth suicide in India
