= Stephen MacMahon =

Founder of The George Institute for Global Health

Professor Stephen MacMahon AO FAA FMedSci FAHMS

Personal details
- Born: Stephen William MacMahon Scotland

Stephen William MacMahon is a British-Australian academic medical researcher, healthcare entrepreneur and founder of The George Institute for Global Health. He holds professorial academic appointments in medicine at UNSW Sydney and Imperial College London.

== Education and early career ==
MacMahon was born in Scotland and emigrated with his family to New Zealand where he completed his school education. At age 16, he won a scholarship to study at the University of Canterbury Christchurch, from which he graduated in 1979. He went on to study in Australia at the UNSW Sydney School of Medicine, graduating in 1985. Subsequently, in 1996, the UNSW Sydney Faculty of Medicine awarded him the university's highest research degree (Doctor of Science in Medicine).

In 1985, the Australian Heart Foundation awarded MacMahon a 2-year post-graduate scholarship to undertake research at the US National Heart, Lung and Blood Institute and complete requirements for admission as a Fellow of the American College of Cardiology. In 1987, he was awarded a 2-year Junior Research Fellowship by Green Templeton College at the University of Oxford. There, he worked in the Clinical Trials Services Unit of the Nuffield Department of Medicine with Professor Sir Richard Peto.

In 1989, he moved back to New Zealand to a National Heart Foundation-funded academic position at the University of Auckland. He established a Clinical Trials Research Unit in the University Department of Medicine at Auckland City Hospital and was appointed Senior Lecturer and then Associate Professor of Medicine and Clinical Pharmacology. He remained in these roles until 1999, when he moved to Sydney to take up an appointment as Medical Foundation Professor of Cardiovascular Medicine at the University of Sydney. There, in partnership with Professor Robyn Norton AO, he established The George Institute for Global Health (then known as the Sydney Institute for International Health). In 2017, The George Institute moved its Australian university affiliation from the University of Sydney to UNSW Sydney.

== Research ==
Throughout his career, most of MacMahon's research has focused on the causes and treatment of cardiometabolic diseases. Much of that work has concerned the effects of blood pressure and blood pressure lowering on the risks of stroke and coronary heart disease. In his early work with Peto at Oxford, he showed that the associations of blood pressure levels with stroke and coronary heart disease incidence were continuous down to very low levels within those usually considered "normal". On that basis, he postulated that blood pressure lowering may prevent stroke and coronary heart disease even among those without hypertension.

To test this, he designed and led two large-scale clinical trials assessing the effects of blood pressure-lowering treatment on major cardiovascular disease outcomes in individuals at high risk, irrespective of the initial level of blood pressure. The PROGRESS trial focused on the effects of treatment in patients who had suffered already stroke, and the ADVANCE trial focussed on the effects of treatment in patients with diabetes. Both these trials showed that blood pressure-lowering treatment reduced the risks of serious cardiovascular disease outcomes in hypertensive and non-hypertensive patients. The ADVANCE trial also showed that intensive reduction in blood glucose in high-risk patients with diabetes reduced the risk of death, as well the risk of major vascular complications associated with diabetes. The results of these trials have had an impact on many clinical guidelines for the treatment of diabetes, stroke and hypertension worldwide.

Some of MacMahon's more recent work has focused on multimorbidity (the coexistence of multiple chronic or acute conditions). He chaired the committee of the UK Faculty of Medical Sciences that produced the first report on research needs in this area. That report has proven pivotal in generating major investment in research on the causes and treatment of multimorbidity.

== The George Institute for Global Health ==
MacMahon's work at Oxford, Auckland and Sydney involved collaboration with clinical and epidemiological researchers across Asia and this experience led him to suspect that most of the global cardiovascular disease burden was being experienced by people living in low- and middle-income countries, not high-income countries, as was widely believed. This was subsequently proven correct by the Global Burden of Disease Project. His collaborations with researchers across the Asia Pacific region also led him to suspect that treatment for cardiovascular diseases was likely to be inadequate in many low- and middle-income countries. In parallel, his colleague, Robyn Norton, observed that the burden of injuries – particular that resulting from motor vehicle crashes – was also growing rapidly in many of the same countries, and, once again, it appeared that treatment for trauma was inadequate.

They recognised that the research base upon which to develop regionally relevant strategies for prevention and treatment of many of the most serious non-infectious conditions was extremely weak. And it was for this reason that in 1999 they established The George Institute for Global Health (formerly the Sydney Institute for International Health). From an initial staff of three, the Institute grew to a staff of more than 1,000 worldwide over the subsequent two decades, during which more than $1.5 billion in research funding was secured. By 2022, the Institute had major research centres in India, China, the UK and Australia, and research collaborations across Africa, Asia, Latin America, North America and Europe.

MacMahon and Norton stood down from their roles as Principal Directors of The George Institute in December 2022 and remain as Founding Directors.

== Entrepreneurship ==
Increasing the contribution of the private sector to improving the health of people in low- and middle-income counties has been one of MacMahon's long-term goals. This has involved both advocacy and direct leverage of private sector resources.

In 2019, he founded George Medicines Pty Ltd, raising $53 million in private equity capital to develop two new low-cost drug treatments for hypertension and diabetes. Each of these treatments comprise combinations of ultra-low-doses of drugs with complementary mechanisms, designed to maximize benefits and minimize side effects. MacMahon oversaw the design, development and conduct of the preclinical research programs that generated the evidence on which patents for both treatments are based. He was also centrally involved in the design and conduct of the clinical research programs required for regulatory approval. The hypertension treatment was approved by the FDA in 2025. The treatment was also subsequently shown to prevent recurrent stroke among patients who had previously suffered a cerebral hemorrhage. George Medicines' business model is based on profitability in established markets and affordability in emerging markets

Additionally, he founded George Clinical, a commercial health research organization with operations across the world, including many countries in Asia. The company was established to provide research services to the pharmaceutical industry, leveraging the experience of George Institute researchers in order to generate financial resources for reinvestment in the Institute's programs of research, advocacy and training. In 2023, George Clinical was acquired by private equity company, Hillhouse, creating a large endowment for The George Institute to pursue its work with low and middle-income countries worldwide.

== Awards and recognition ==
MacMahon has received numerous honors and awards for his work. These include election as a fellow of the Australian Academy of Science (FAA), the UK Academy of Medical Sciences (FMedSci), and the Australian Academy of Health & Medical Science (FAHMS), in addition to his fellowship of the American College of Cardiology (FACC). In 2015, he was listed by Thomsons Reuters as one of "The World's Most Influential Scientific Minds" He was made an Officer of the Order of Australia (AO) in the 2017 Queen's Birthday Honours List for distinguished services to medical research. For his research programs on the prevention and treatment of cardiometabolic diseases, he has twice been the recipient of an Excellence Award from the National Health and Medical Research Council of Australia. For his role in the establishment of George Clinical and George Medicines he was named EY Social Entrepreneur of the Year in 2013.
