= Rod Jackson =

Rod Jackson may refer to:

- Rod Jackson (musician)
- Rod Jackson (politician)
- Rod Jackson (rugby league)
- Rod Jackson (epidemiologist)
