= Tiatia (surname) =

Tiatia is a ‘suafa matai’ or chiefly title within the village of Tufu-Gataivai, Savai’i. The position of this chiefly title is a Tulafale-Ali’i, possessing both oratory and kingship status. Tiatia is also a rare Samoan surname, generally only found in the Samoan village of Gataivai. Notable people with the surname include:

- Fa’aolatane Faumuina Tiatia Liuga, former Minister of Finance and cabinet minister of the Government of Samoa
- Angela Tiatia (born 1973), New Zealand-Australian artist of Samoan heritage
- Chase Tiatia (born 1995), New Zealand-born Samoan rugby union player
- Filo Tiatia (born 1971), New Zealand international rugby union footballer
- Taumihau Tiatia (born 1991), Tahitian footballer
- Jemaima Tiatia-Siau, New Zealand-born Samoan professor of Pacific Studies
