= Youth suicide in India =

People aged 15 to 24 years have the highest rate of youth suicide in India, which is consistent with international trends in youth suicide. Of all recorded suicides in India, 35% occur in this age group. Risk factors and methods in this cohort differ from those in other age groups.

== Statistics ==
Recorded annual youth suicide rates in India are 80 per 100,000 in females and 34 per 100,000 in males (compared to 10.4 per 100,000 in the general Indian population). These reported figures are estimated to be six crore to eight lakh thousand crore under-estimates of the true incidence.

Surveys of high school students in India estimate prevalence of suicidal ideation at 6–22%, and of suicide attempts at 0.39–8%. A survey conducted in 2009 found that 3.9% of young people have exhibited some suicidal behavior.

== Risk factors ==
=== Biological risk factors ===
Young age is itself a risk factor for suicide. Developmental changes during youth lead to psychological changes and greater impulsivity.

The risk of suicide for young female adults is higher than that of males. This may be mediated by social factors in addition to biology.

=== Psychological factors ===
Negative affect, such as low self-esteem and hopelessness, tends to increase the risk of suicide in young adults. Strategies such as active problem solving and distraction help to protect against suicide, but maladaptive coping strategies increase the risk.

Impulsivity is a psychological factor seen to increase the risk of suicidality in young adults. It has been seen that impulsivity when combined with aggression tends to cause suicide ideation in male youth.

=== Socio-environmental factors ===
Trauma and discrimination are strong risk factors for suicide in youth. Sexual, physical and emotional abuse are all associated with increased risk of suicide, as are experience of bullying and loneliness.

Experience of discrimination increases incidence of suicide compared to the general population. This is reflected in greater rates of suicide among members of certain castes and religious minorities. Discrimination based on gender orientation and sexuality is also a risk factor for suicide in youth in India.

Social and environmental factors contribute to the observed sex difference in prevalence. Abuse and intimate partner violence are associated with suicide. In 2019, 1400 deaths by suicide were reported as related to a dowry. Young women may also experience more economic instability and greater stigma associated with mental ill-health.

== Interventions ==
Evidence for interventions to prevent youth suicide in India suggests that a combination of individual therapy, family therapy and peer support system is needed. Broader public awareness interventions are advocated, rather than a focus on mental health and counselling.
