= Lisa Jackson Pulver =

Australian medical educator

- Born: 1959 (age 66–67); Stanmore, New South Wales, Australia
- Education: University of Sydney and Deakin University
- Occupation: Epidemiologist
- Organization: University of Sydney
- Known for: Processes to support scholarships and other programs to support Indigenous youths.

Lisa Rae Jackson Pulver AM (born 1959) is an Aboriginal Australian epidemiologist and researcher in the area of Aboriginal health who has been Deputy Vice Chancellor at the University of Sydney since October 2018.

== Early life and education ==
Lisa Rae Jackson was born in Stanmore in 1959 and grew up in Revesby. Her father served in the Second World War and struggled with mental health issues and addictions. She was told her maternal grandmother was a "Maori princess", but learned later in childhood that she had Aboriginal ancestors on both sides of her family. Since confirming her ancestry, she has identified as a Wiradjuri Koori woman with connections to south western New South Wales and South Australia. Her family members also came from Wales and Scotland. Her parents divorced in the 1980s, but later got back together and planned to remarry, however her father died of asbestosis.

Jackson Pulver ran away from home at age 14 to escape her abusive father. Aged 17, she went to Bankstown Technical College and took a nursing entrance course before undertaking hospital based training at Lidcombe Hospital. A decade later, she applied to study medicine at Sydney University. During her studies, she was a founding member of the university's Wokal Kangara Aboriginal Student's Association. She eventually graduated with a degree in public health, and was the first in her family to attend university.

Jackson Pulver received a PhD in medicine from the University of Sydney in 2003, and is the first known Aboriginal person to have achieved this award. Her thesis was titled "An argument on culture safety in health service delivery: towards better health outcomes for Aboriginal people".

== Career ==
In 2003, Jackson Pulver became a lecturer in Aboriginal health at the University of New South Wales (UNSW). She played a key role in the development of Muru Marri, a designated Aboriginal and Torres Strait Islander Health unit at UNSW and was the inaugural chair of Aboriginal Health. She co-founded the Shalom Gamarada Scholarship Program at UNSW, which offers residential scholarship to Indigenous students.

Jackson Pulver was pro vice-chancellor engagement, pro-vice chancellor Aboriginal and Torres Strait Islander Leadership and Provost Parramatta South Campus at Western Sydney University. In October 2018, she was appointed deputy vice chancellor, Indigenous Strategy and Services at the University of Sydney by vice-chancellor Michael Spence.

Jackson Pulver was a member of the National Health and Medical Research Council's committee for Aboriginal Health and has also worked with the Australian Bureau of Statistics and Universities Australia. She has also been deputy chairperson for the Australian Health Minister's Advisory Council's National Advisory Group Aboriginal and Torres Strait Islander Health Information and Data, and a ministerial appointment to the Australian Statistical Advisory Council. In 2010, she was appointed a board member for the Lowitja Institute, Australia's national body dedicated to Aboriginal and Torres Strait Islander health research. In 2014, she spent a month as "Scientist in Residence" for NITV, SBS's indigenous news channel. She continues to work with the Australian Bureau of Statistics and Universities Australia.

Jackson Pulver is a member of the Australian Medical Council and a member of the board.

Jackson Pulver joined the Royal Australian Air Force as a public health epidemiologist in the Specialist Reserve in 2004. She later became a specialist adviser to the Chief of Air Force and set up the RAAF's Directorate of Aboriginal and Torres Strait Islander Affairs. She was involved in developing the RAAF's Indigenous Youth Program.

== Awards and honours ==
Jackson Pulver was awarded for her contribution to cancer epidemiology by the Aboriginal Health and Medical Research Council and the Ministry of Science and Medical Research in 2005 and was awarded a Henry Stricker Community Honour for her outstanding service and contribution rendered with endeavours to make our society a better place in which to live in 2006. She received the Individual Partnership Award from the UNSW Research Centre for Primary Health Care and Equity in 2011.

In 2011, Jackson Pulver was made a Member of the Order of Australia for "service to medical education, particularly through the Muru Marri Indigenous Health Unity at the University of New South Wales, and as a supported of educational opportunities for Aboriginal and Torres Strait Islander people." She became a fellow of the Royal Society of NSW in 2021.

== Personal life ==
Jackson met Mark Pulver, a widower and electrical engineer, in 2001 and they later married. She began to attend the Newtown synagogue and after becoming pregnant, they decided they wanted their children to be Jewish, so she converted in 2004. She had a number of miscarriages and they did not have any children. She became president of Newtown Synagogue in 2010, the first female in the role. She said "For me, being Jewish is not contrary to my beliefs in spirituality as an Aboriginal woman." As of 2018, she was a member of Sydney's Great Synagogue.

Jackson Pulver has a long history of political advocacy. She marched with Aboriginal people for land rights in the 70s and 80s and continues this support.

== Selected publications ==
- Pulver, Lisa R. Jackson; Bush, Alison; Ward, Jeanette (2003). "Identification of Aboriginal and Torres Strait Islander women using an urban obstetric hospital". Australian Health Review. 26 (2): 19–25. doi:10.1071/AH030019. PMID 15368832.
- Anderson, Ian; Crengle, Sue; Leialoha Kamaka, Martina; Chen, Tai Ho; Palafox, Neal; Jackson Pulver, Lisa (27 May 2006). "Indigenous health in Australia, New Zealand, and the Pacific". The Lancet. 367 (9524): 1775–1785. doi:10.1016/S0140-6736(06)68773-4. PMID 16731273. S2CID 451840.
- Graham, S.; Jackson Pulver, L. R.; Wang, Y. A. (2007). "The urban–remote divide for Indigenous perinatal outcomes". Medical Journal of Australia. 186 (10): 509–512. doi:10.5694/j.1326-5377.2007.tb01024.x. hdl:1885/35922. PMID 17516897. S2CID 17613204.
- Jackson Pulver, Lisa Rae (2009). "Growing more Aboriginal health professionals: the 2009 Shalom Gamarada Ngiyani Yana Art Exhibition and show". Medical Journal of Australia. 190 (10).
- Kervin, Beth E.; Kemp, Lynn; Jackson Pulver, Lisa (2010). "Types and timing of breastfeeding support and its impact on mothers' behaviours". Journal of Paediatrics and Child Health. 46 (3): 85–91. doi:10.1111/j.1440-1754.2009.01643.x. PMID 20136700. S2CID 29843849.
- Pulver, Lisa Jackson (2010). "Indigenous Health-Australia, Canada, Aotearoa New Zealand and the United States–Laying claim to a future that embraces health for us all" (PDF). Geneva, Switzerland: World Health Organisation. Archived from the original (PDF) on 22 December 2011.
- Clifford, A.; Pulver, L. (2011). "Smoking, nutrition, alcohol and physical activity interventions targeting Indigenous Australians: rigorous evaluations and new directions needed". Australian and New Zealand Journal of Public Health. 35 (1): 38–46. doi:10.1111/j.1753-6405.2010.00631.x. PMID 21299699.
