= Janie Sheridan =

New Zealand academic and as of 2018 is a full professor at the University of Auckland

Jane Lois Sheridan
- Education: University College London
- Scientific career
- Fields: Pharmacology
- Workplaces: University of Auckland
- Thesis: HIV/AIDS and drug misuse : perspectives of pharmacy undergraduates and pharmacists (1995)

Jane 'Janie' Lois Sheridan is a New Zealand academic and as of 2018 is a full professor at the University of Auckland.

== Academic career ==
After a 1995 PhD titled 'HIV/AIDS and drug misuse : perspectives of pharmacy undergraduates and pharmacists' at the University of London, Sheridan moved to the University of Auckland, rising to full professor.

Sheridan's research has focused on public-good issues around prescription and consumption of drugs.

== Selected works ==
- Strang, John, Janie Sheridan, and Nick Barber. "Prescribing injectable and oral methadone to opiate addicts: results from the 1995 national postal survey of community pharmacies in England and Wales." BMJ 313, no. 7052 (1996): 270–272.
- Sheridan, Janie, John Strang, Nick Barber, and Alan Glanz. "Role of community pharmacies in relation to HIV prevention and drug misuse: findings from the 1995 national survey in England and Wales." BMJ 313, no. 7052 (1996): 272–274.
- Clark, Terryann, Theresa Fleming, Patricia Bullen, Simon Denny, Sue Crengle, Ben Dyson, Sarah Fortune et al. Youth'12 Overview: The health and wellbeing of New Zealand secondary school students in 2012. University of Auckland, Faculty of Medical and Health Sciences, 2013.
- Winstock, Adam R., Toby Lea, and Janie Sheridan. "Prevalence of diversion and injection of methadone and buprenorphine among clients receiving opioid treatment at community pharmacies in New South Wales, Australia." International Journal of Drug Policy 19, no. 6 (2008): 450–458.
- Strang, John, Janie Sheridan, Claire Hunt, Bethanne Kerr, Clare Gerada, and Michael Pringle. "The prescribing of methadone and other opioids to addicts: national survey of GPs in England and Wales." Br J Gen Pract 55, no. 515 (2005): 444–451.
