= Anne Herman =

Cook Islands politician

Anne Herman, sometimes Anne Herman-Fua, is a Cook Islands public servant. She was named Secretary of Internal Affairs in 2018. She is a graduate of Victoria University of Wellington, from which she received a degree in economics and commercial law, and the University of the South Pacific, from which she received an MBA, and has passed much of her career in the banking industry. She was CEO of the Cook Islands National Superannuation Fund, and spent five years working for the ANZ Banking Group. Herman is the niece of the Cook Islands Secretary of Health, Josephine Herman; the two were appointed to their roles at the same time by Prime Minister Henry Puna.
