= Josephine Herman =

Cook Islands politician

Josephine Aumea Herman is a Cook Islands medical doctor. She was the Secretary of Health in the Cook Islands government from June 2018 to 2021. After that she was Director of Pacific Health at Waitematā District Health Board, then Chief Clinical Advisor for Pacific Health at the Ministry of Health in New Zealand.

== Career ==
A doctor with a research PhD, Herman studied medicine in Port Moresby in Papua New Guinea and at the University of Auckland. Her doctoral advisors were Shanthi Ameratunga and Rod Jackson. She is a volunteer with the organization Doctors Assisting in South-Pacific Islands (DAISI), and is vice-chair of Pacific Heads of Health. In her official capacity she was responsible for coordinating the government's response to the 2019 outbreak of dengue fever on the islands. She has spoken of the need to preserve Cook Islands Māori. Herman is the aunt of the Cook Islands Secretary of Internal Affairs Anne Herman; the two were named to their department secretary roles at the same time by Prime Minister Henry Puna.

During the COVID-19 pandemic in the Cook Islands, Herman led the country's official response to the pandemic. At the start, she spearheaded efforts to get stranded Cook Islanders back home from New Zealand despite their lockdown policy. However, in November 2020, she tendered her resignation effective of February 2021, this was due to the fact that she agreed that she would only serve one term as Health Secretary. In 2026, she was awarded the Taiki Paeru o te Atukura Leadership Mace for her work during the pandemic.
