= Rod Jackson (epidemiologist) =

New Zealand scientist (born 1954)

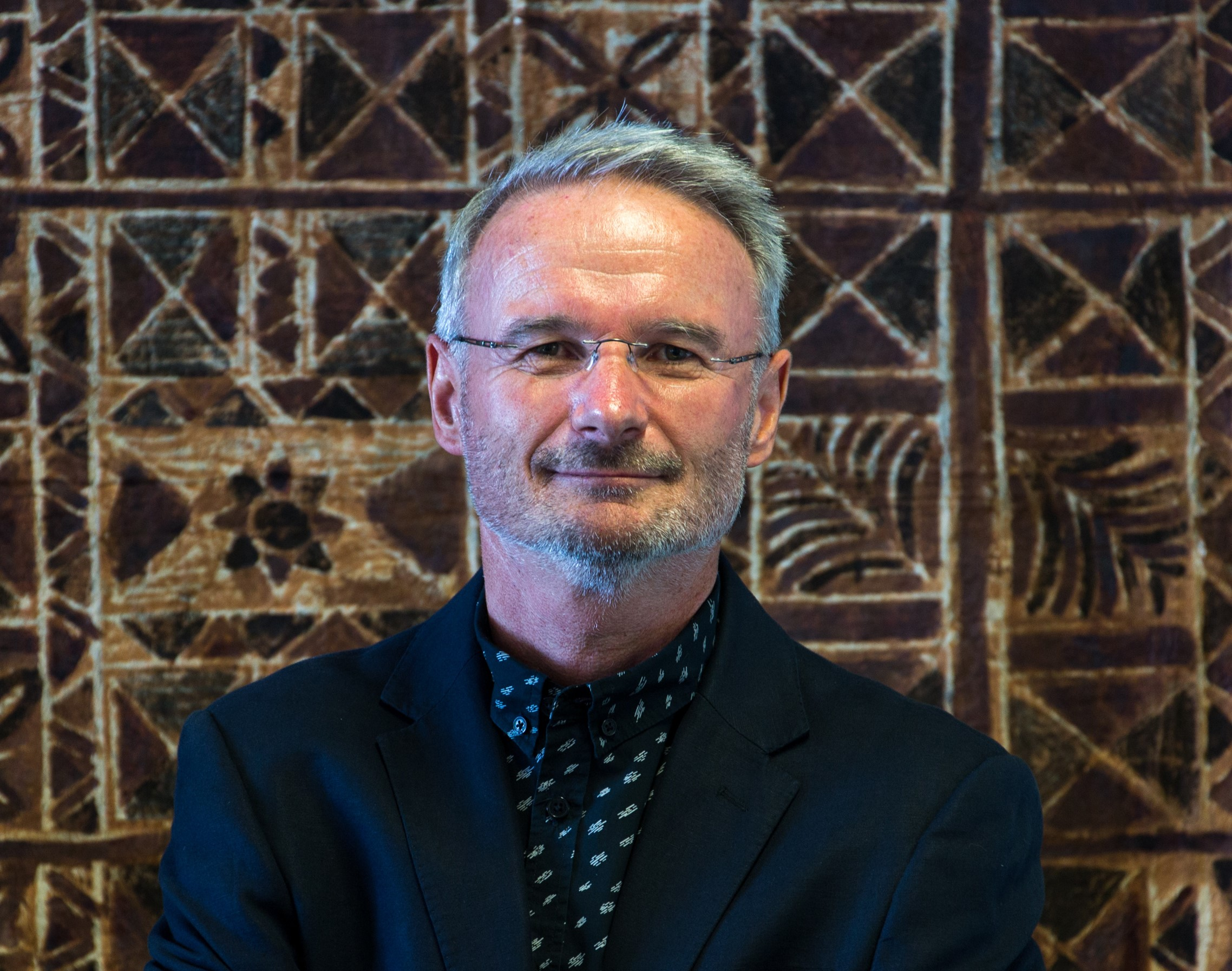
- Jackson in 2017
- Born: Rodney Thornton Jackson; 1954 (age 71–72); A farm near Dargaville, New Zealand
- Education: University of Auckland
- Known for: The epidemiology of chronic diseases, particularly cardiovascular diseases
- Scientific career
- Fields: Epidemiology
- Workplaces: University of Auckland
- Thesis: The Auckland heart study: a case-control study of coronary heart disease (1989)
- Doctoral advisor: Robert Beaglehole
- Doctoral students: Josephine Herman; Shanthi Ameratunga
- Website: University of Auckland profile

Rodney Thornton Jackson FRSNZ (born 1954) is a New Zealand medically trained epidemiologist who has had lead roles in publicly funded research focussing on systems to effectively identify risk factors in the epidemiology of chronic diseases, in particular cardiovascular diseases (CVDs). This involved linking large cohort studies to regional and national electronic health databases and enabling the generation of new risk-prevention equations using web-based tools, such as the PREDICT model, to implement, monitor and improve risk assessment and management guidelines. Research on asthma in which Jackson participated influenced decisions made by the New Zealand Ministry of Health, and he has contributed to public debate on dietary risk factors for heart attacks and strokes. Following an evidence-based approach to identification of disparities in medical outcomes for different groups within the New Zealand population, Jackson took a position on racism in the medical sector. In 2020, he became a frequent commentator in the media on the approach of the New Zealand government to the COVID-19 pandemic. Since 1999, Jackson has been professor of epidemiology at the University of Auckland.

== Education and career ==
At the University of Auckland, Jackson obtained a Bachelor of Science (BSc) in 1974, and a Bachelor of Medicine, Bachelor of Surgery (MB ChB) in 1977. A postgraduate diploma in obstetrics and gynaecology (DipObst) was completed at Auckland in 1980, as was a postgraduate diploma in community health (DipComH) from the University of Otago in 1983. Jackson completed a Master of Medical Sciences (MMedSc) in community health at the University of Auckland in 1984, and a PhD in epidemiology at the same institution in 1989. He also trained in public health medicine, receiving his fellowship in public health medicine in 1990. Between 1990 and 1998, Jackson held roles as a senior lecturer and associate professor at University of Auckland, with a position in 1996 as visiting professor at the Centre for Evidence Based Medicine at the University of Oxford. From 1999 to 2003, Jackson was professor and head of the Department of Community Health, in the Faculty of Medical and Health Sciences, at Auckland. Since 2004, he has been professor of epidemiology, and served as head of the Section of Epidemiology and Biostatistics, in the School of Population Health, Faculty of Medical and Health Sciences, between 2004 and 2009.

== Epidemiologic studies ==
=== Integration of data ===
Since around 2000, Jackson's main research has focused on integrating public health and healthcare epidemiology by linking individual and national data, scalable from individual patients to patient groups to entire populations. He initially established the PREDICT study and subsequently led the establishment of the VIEW research programs.

In 2011, Jackson co-authored an article in The New Zealand Medical Journal that challenged the manner in which New Zealand district health boards (DHBs) had managed the health needs of patients with long-term conditions. While the article acknowledged that some chronic diseases were preventable by "addressing shared risk factors, mainly tobacco use, unhealthy diet and physical inactivity...these interventions are dependent on several key factors; accurate identification of high-risk patients; systematic offering of interventions to these patients and; long-term self-management and maintenance." The paper suggested the use of information technology to provide a more patient-centred approach that linked data from the initial screening through to medical interventions and rehabilitation.

Jackson was involved in research in 2018 that created three data-based populations: a New Zealand population derived from Statistics New Zealand's Integrated Data Infrastructure (IDI), a 2013 census population and a 2013 Health Service Utilisation population. The aim of the research was to compare the differences in cardiovascular disease prevalence estimates derived from each of the cohorts. The data showed largest percentage differences between the IDI and the other populations for males and those aged from 15 to 34 years, but the largest differences were for people living in deprived areas, with ethnic distributing varying across the three cohorts. The study noted that the "Health Service Utilisation population generally overestimated cardiovascular disease prevalence, while the Census population generally underestimated it...[and concluded that]...The New Zealand IDI population is the most comprehensive and appropriate national cohort for use in health and social research."

In 2021, Jackson co-led a team that was funded by the Health Research Council of New Zealand to create an "anonymized register of cardiovascular and related risks to help combat the likes of diabetes, gout, obesity and heart failure" in the five-year VAREANZ (Vascular Risk Equity for All New Zealanders)research programme. A paper on the methodology to be used in this programme co-authored by Jackson noted that while there were some limitations to the data gathering, the strength of the programme was that the "datasets are ideal for examining variation across demographic or clinically-defined groups in the use of hospital services, outpatient clinics and pharmacotherapy or other research questions relating to treatment, outcomes and prognosis for CVD and related conditions."

=== PREDICT ===
Since 2002, Jackson has co-led PREDICT, a large-scale cohort study of CVD risk prediction, which is now the world's largest prospective study of CVD in primary care with over 500,000 participants. Jackson and his team, in partnership with Enigma, a New Zealand company specialising in web solutions in healthcare, developed the web-based PREDICT decision support software for the assessment and management of CVD risk. The study provided clinical decision support for New Zealand primary care practitioners while also creating a research cohort, with every patient risk assessment being stored and linked to future hospitalisations and death using secure encryption methodology. In the 19th paper published about the study, it was stated that the use of the software had led to a "better understanding of the acceptability and impact of computerized decision support in primary care, data reliability and variations in risk factor profiles between ethnicities...[because]...the cohort was derived directly from routine practice with the authorisation to generate a single ethnicity classification across multiple databases...[so]...if a patient self-identifies as Māori in any of the linked databases, they will be classified as Māori.

Research published in 2018, used the PREDICT computer algorithm to develop equations relevant to patients in contemporary primary care, and documented the performance of these new equations to assess the risk profiles of a nationally representative cohort of New Zealanders. The effectiveness of the equations compared favorability to data gathered by the American College of Cardiology using the prediction equations currently in use at the time in that country.

Jackson participated in a 2020 study that documented the efficiency of a newly developed risk equation (PREDICT-2) in estimating the five-year risk of CVD event recurrence among patients aged 30–79 years with known atherosclerotic cardiovascular disease (ASCVD). The study showed that the PREDICT-2 risk equation complemented the PREDICT-1 risk scores for primary prevention of CVD because it was well calibrated to the New Zealand population and could "rationally and transparently target more intensive interventions to those at elevated CVD risk across the population."

The value of the PREDICT model was evidenced in a study on cardiovascular risk equations for diabetes patients from New Zealand and Chinese electronic health records (CREDENCE) study in 2021 which investigated cardiovascular risk in two large contemporary cohorts of people with type 2 diabetes from New Zealand and China. The study was designed to derive and evaluate CVD risk prediction models and equations in cohorts from both countries—one developed, one developing—to determine if the models were equally applicable. Both population studies were built on data from electronic health records, using PREDICT-T2D cohort for New Zealand and CHERRY-T2D cohort for China. The paper, co-authored by Jackson, recorded that there were "5926 (7.7% fatal) CVD events in the New Zealand cohort and 3650 (8.8% fatal) in the Chinese cohort but demonstrated that the most common types of CVD events differed significantly between the cohorts. The research results have implications for policy makers, clinicians and the public and will facilitate personalised management of cardiovascular risk in people with type 2 diabetes worldwide."

=== Other risk prediction projects ===
In 2017 Jackson participated in a study to investigate integration of individual level data with data at a national level for a country's total adult population, to develop a synthetic national population model to predict the risk of cardiovascular disease. The study shows that it is possible to develop this model with "demographic and CVD-risk profiles using national census data, routine national hospitalisation and medication data and a large sub-national primary care dataset," and the researchers conclude that this would "inform CVD risk management guideline updates in New Zealand and elsewhere."

Jackson was involved in research in 2021 that assessed the value of a machine learning-based risk approach for cardiovascular disease risk prediction across the national population of New Zealand. The study concludes that the deep learning models performed well in terms of calibration and discrimination of the probability estimate, are readily available and "could be applied to large health administrative datasets to derive interpretable CVD risk prediction equations that are more accurate than traditional Cox proportional hazards models."

He took part in Research funded by Health Research Council of New Zealand, National Heart Foundation of New Zealand and Healthier Lives National Science Challenge, which focused on predicting cardiovascular risk in middle-aged adults with diabetes. A paper he co-authored, suggests that internationally doctors might be unnecessarily administering expensive drug treatments to patients with diabetes due to "over-estimating patients' risks of cardiovascular problems such as heart disease and stroke... [and that] these findings have clear international implications as increased diabetes screening will lead to the identification of many people with asymptomatic diabetes who were at low risk. Jackson commented that "for the first time, general practitioners here are able to use risk prediction equations developed in New Zealand and derived from New Zealand patients, ... [and] ...these are currently the most accurate equations in the world for predicting risk of heart attacks and strokes in people with diabetes."

=== Polypill project ===
From 2006 to 2012, Jackson was a Co-Investigator on the Polypill project at University of Auckland. This involved bundling a group cardiovascular disease reduction drugs to give the flexibility to modify the daily dose of each drug. A report from the London School of Pharmacy, authored by Professor David Taylor said that this approach, when combined with other changes to lifestyle could be effective, and called for policies based on science "that encourage pharmaceutical companies to create polypills using older generic medicines."

=== VIEW and VAREANZ programmes ===
Since 2011 Jackson and his team have received consecutive 5-year Health Research Council programme grants to undertake a series of studies linking large-scale datasets from primary and secondary (hospital) care settings with national health administrative datasets. The 2011 VIEW (Vascular Informatics using Epidemiology and the Web) programme was followed by 2016 VIEW2020 programme and the VAREANZ programme to begin in 2022. These research programmes recognised that some available treatments could reduce the risk of early vascular disease, but because of possible under-and over-treatment, there were inequities related to ethnicity and deprivation that were difficult to recognise because of few valid risk-predictions algorithms being available.

The VIEW programmes aimed to:

i. develop new risk prediction algorithms to assist clinicians estimate vascular risk in multiple high-risk populations; ii. determine in whom, where and why, under- and over-treatment and inequities in vascular risk and risk management occur; iii. develop and implement a multi-algorithm risk prediction engine and a 'big-data' vascular health information platform to support initiatives to increase appropriate treatment, reduce inequities in vascular disease outcomes and improve overall vascular health.

The aims of the VAREANZ programme are to:

- create a unified updatable national risk register including every New Zealander – the VAREANZ Register, to characterise everyone's cardio-vascular-metabolic risk profile;
- establish a Māori-led, equity-focussed big-health-data sovereignty governance group to provide oversight of every aspect of the research;
- establish a big-health-data science expert group to provide oversight of the VAREANZ Register data ecosystem to create it, manage it, curate it, keep it secure, and make it accessible; and
- predict cardio-vascular-metabolic risks of everyone on the VAREANZ Register, identify cardio-vascular-metabolic risk-equity-gaps, inform stakeholders, and monitor progress towards closing the gaps.

== Research on asthma medications ==
In 1982 a research team, of which Jackson was a member, examined an abrupt disproportionate increase in reported deaths from asthma in New Zealand after 1976 compared to several other countries. Suggested explanations included the possibility the disease in New Zealand may be more severe, that there might be environmental factors specific to New Zealand, or what they concluded was the most likely explanation, changes in the way asthma was managed in the country. One of these changes was noted as an "undue reliance on bronchodilator drugs to the exclusion of appropriate prophylaxis and delays in giving corticosteroids in the severe acute attack." The research, from this paper and another one, was cited in a study which tested the hypothesis that "unsupervised self administration of fenoterol by inhalation increases the risk of death from asthma...[and concluded]...there are now three New Zealand case-control studies, each using different sources of data, indicating that inhaled fenoterol- increases the risk of death in patients with severe asthma."

In 1989, the New Zealand Ministry of Health received a report that assessed the relationship between prescribed fenoterol and deaths from asthma in New Zealand. It noted that although an earlier report had stated a possible causal association could have been produced by a combination of "information bias, confounding and chance", the author had considered further studies and was able to conclude: "the consistency and strength of the evidence for an empiric relationship between fenoterol prescription and asthma deaths leads to the conclusion that fenoterol prescription is likely to increase the risk of death from asthma...[and]...clinical and policy decisions should be based on this assessment.

By 1995 a paper co-authored by Jackson, confirmed the earlier findings that inhaled fenoterol was associated with increased asthma-related deaths in New Zealand since 1976, and noted that the New Zealand Department of Health had "issued warnings about the safety of fenoterol and restricted its availability." A publication in 2007 by Neil Pearce, one of the research team of which Jackson was a member, was described by one reviewer in The Lancet as "a compelling book that describes the real-life events behind the identification of fenoterol as the causative agent behind the epidemic." Helen Clark, the New Zealand Prime Minister at the time, said in the foreword to the book that "the work of Neil Pearce and his colleagues seemed to show that this 'epidemic' of deaths had coincided almost exactly with the widespread use of fenoterol in New Zealand, starting in 1976."

== Debate about dietary risk factors for CVD ==
Jackson commented in 2002 on what were being perceived at the time as 'mixed messages' about alcohol and the risk of heart attacks. In the Newsletter of the Alcohol Advisory Council of New Zealand, Jackson noted that there was evidence of a link of light-to-moderate drinking to a reduced risk of CVD, but cautioned that "drinking alcohol is always a balance between benefits and harm...[and]...the benefit is only to those people whose risk of heart attack and stroke is high enough to significantly gain from having the risk lowered, and this falls into a certain age range...In general, men have to be over 45 to 50 and women over 55 to 60 to get more health benefits than harm from drinking." Jackson subsequently published a paper in 2005 entitled Alcohol and ischaemic heart disease: probably no free lunch which concluded that "Any coronary protection from light to moderate drinking will be very small and unlikely to outweigh the harms. While moderate to heavy drinking is probably coronary-protective, any benefit will be overwhelmed by the known harms. If so, the public-health message is clear. Do not assume there is a window in which the health benefits of alcohol are greater than the harms— there is probably no free lunch."

An article in The New Zealand Herald in 2014 reported a debate between Jackson and Grant Schofield on whether saturated fats were healthy. Jackson's position was that he was "deeply concerned the Schofield camp, with its promotion of butter, cream and coconut oil, is setting the nation on a path to increased coronary artery disease, after more than 30 years of falling heart disease mortality." Schofield claimed that while their interactions were initially heated, they did later discuss some science – without agreeing on anything. Jackson said he told Schofield that he thought it was both "irresponsible and dangerous to encourage the public to eat more saturated fat, given the weight of evidence about saturated fat and coronary heart disease". There was a range of opinions from other contributors to the article.

In 2015, when there was public debate about the value of a high-fat low-carbohydrate diet, Jackson gave a public lecture in Dunedin outlining the data that showed "the steady decline in the use of saturated fat sources such as butter (which represents 20–25% of our saturated fat intake in New Zealand) has been followed by a 90% decline in cardiovascular disease events." Jackson had previously challenged claims made by Nina Teicholz in an interview on New Zealand radio, that fat was not the "enemy in diet". He said that Teicholz was ill-informed or disingenuous because the evidence had shown that since the late 1960s people were healthier due to a reduction in cardiovascular disease because of a decrease in the consumption of saturated fats.

Following a claim in 2014 by three academics that there was no causal link between the amount of saturated fat consumed and the likelihood of coronary heart disease, Jackson acknowledged the difficulty in accurately assessing and quantifying a person's diet and the challenges in developing cohort studies with high and low saturated fat exposure categories. However, he said that there needed to be a consideration of the significant consistency of evidence from a wide range of sources that saturated fat uptake is strongly related to cardiovascular disease, and there was a concern the advice that 'the public should be left to chew the saturated fat', could lead to a "reversal of the major declines in coronary disease mortality experienced in New Zealand and other high-income countries since the late 1960s."

In an article in 2017 which claimed New Zealand Ministry of Health data showed that the number of deaths from heart disease in New Zealand was increasing, Jackson responded that there was confusion over dietary advice, but butter consumption had increased and due to it being high in saturated fats, was a major cause of heart disease – along with coconut fat which he said should never be eaten at all. A rebuttal to the position that Jackson had taken in that article was published on Grant Schofield's website.

== Disparities of medical outcomes ==
Jackson co-authored the paper for a 2020 study involving 475,241 people that provided evidence Māori and Pacific people had a much higher prevalence of smoking, obesity, heart failure, atrial fibrillation and prior CVD compared with other ethnic groups...[and therefore]...experienced the most significant inequities in exposure to CVD risk factors compared with other ethnic groups...[and]...Strong political commitment and cross-sectoral action to implement effective interventions urgently needed."

A New Zealand longitudinal study published in 2021 in which Jackson participated, explored the relationship between occupational exposures and ischaemic heart disease (IHD) for males and females in the general and Māori populations. The paper acknowledged that while previous research had identified many "psychosocial, organisational, and environmental workplace factors" were linked to cardiovascular disease, the ethnic minorities and females were not fully represented in the data. The 2021 study found inconsistent results across genders and the general and Maori populations, [suggesting] "that occupational risk factors for IHD are not equivalent across all populations and future research and interventions may not be generalizable across all populations."

A news release by the New Zealand Child Poverty Action Group published entitled Preventing Covid-19 health inequities: An urgent duty of care to children in poverty, cited an article co-authored by Jackson that stressed the goal of universal vaccination was cited as being relevant to slowing the spread to of COVID-19 to disadvantaged children and their families.

=== Public policy position ===
In 2020, Jackson was one of several academics who took a public position on racism in the New Zealand health sector. He co-authored an article in the New Zealand Medical Journal that defined systematic racism in terms of how it affected health for marginalised populations by inequitable access to services, prejudice and internalisation by this population of negative messages about their worth and right to equitable services. The article also highlighted "false beliefs" that were claimed contributed to ongoing racism within the health sector in Aotearoa New Zealand and used examples of these in research in which they had explored "differences in cardiovascular disease (CVD) risk factors and outcomes by ethnicity." Following publication of the article, feedback from three reviewers was provided by the New Zealand Medical Journal to the authors, who challenged what they claimed were "racist comments" in the feedback. While it was acknowledged by the authors that they had been given the opportunity to address the comments through the peer review process, they made the case that the editorial process followed by the NZMJ was an example of systemic racism. Reasons they gave for this included an apparent lack of expertise of the reviewers, equal treatment of all comments without any filter on whether they were racist, and that the responses to the racist comments were "sent back to the reviewers who had made those comments (along with our responses to their other comments), which led to further racist comments to which our team were again unnecessarily exposed and to which we again had to respond."

== Commentary on COVID-19 in New Zealand ==
=== Elimination strategy ===
In May 2020, Jackson questioned the approach of Sweden and other countries in attempting to achieve herd immunity to the Coronavirus, and stated that the elimination strategy employed at the time by the New Zealand Government was "the only sensible route in the absence of a vaccine or effective treatment." A group of academics, led by Simon Thornley challenged the decision to go into lockdown, but their claim that COVID-19 was only marginally worse than the seasonal flu was rated as "mostly false" by AAP Factcheck, and in the same document, Jackson said that the Ioannidis study used by the group was "based on specific sub-populations – cities or regions – and tests were conducted over a relatively short period of time, which could also give inaccurate results." Jackson had previously said that Thornley was the "only dissenter in the epidemiological community...[and]... every experienced epidemiologist in the country [was] supporting the Government's elimination approach."

=== Support for vaccination of the population ===
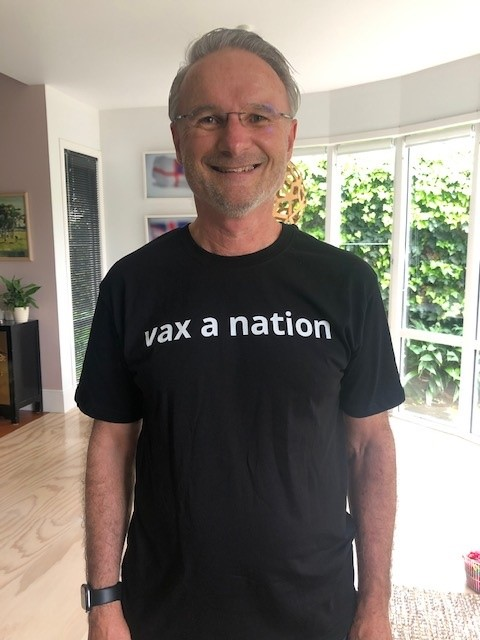
Rod Jackson

Jackson has been a strong advocate for immunisation against the COVID-19 virus and in September 2021 told Hilary Barry and Jeremy Wells on Seven Sharp, a New Zealand TV programme, that the country needed to aim for at least 95% coverage and he was confident New Zealanders could reach that target. He reiterated this on Newshub, noting that vaccination passports were coming, and employers should be able to refuse entry to those who were not vaccinated. Jackson stated at the time that New Zealand needed a more urgent vaccination plan and that the Government would have the support of the majority of people in the country to implement "mandated vaccination for a wide range of jobs...[and]...a unified, non-partisan and radical approach to achieving a minimum 95% of eligible people vaccinated...[ideally including]...5-11-year-olds if the Pfizer vaccine is approved for this age group." By early November 2021, Jackson was saying [that he] "supported widespread public health restrictions and vaccine mandates, not because they are right or wrong, but because Covid-19 is a matter of life or death." He has described the effectiveness of COVID-19 vaccines in preventing severe disease and death as "a modern miracle."

At a webinar arranged by Financial Advice New Zealand on 9 November 2021, Jackson presented a medical perspective on the vaccine mandates that were being introduced by the New Zealand Government. He said COVID-19 is "the worst public health issue since World War II...[and that he was]...a supporter of 'no jab – no job' and virus containment measures saying New Zealand has to pull out all the stops to get Kiwis vaccinated." After debunking COVID-19 and vaccine myths, Jackson suggested to the attendees that "a fully vaccinated office is very good protection against infection and you probably won't have to shut down – the more unvaccinated in your office the more it will spread."

As the COVID-19 vaccine rollout got underway in New Zealand, Jackson commented in November 2021 that even if the target of getting 90% of the eligible population vaccinated was achieved, it would still not be high enough because a quarter of the people in the country would remain unprotected by inoculation and there would be a danger of significant outbreaks, seeing hospitals overrun with insufficient beds for other non-COVID related issues. In a later news item, he stressed the need to push for higher vaccination rates.

By October 2021, when the New Zealand Government announced that fully vaccinated people could home quarantine when returning to the country, Jackson said this could risk the health system being overwhelmed, but the key was to get everyone vaccinated, and this needed to be mandatory for more sectors.

After the New Zealand Government confirmed that vaccine doses should be available for 5 to 11 year olds by January 2022, Jackson said that Māori, Pasifika and lower socioeconomic communities should be prioritised in the vaccination roll-out for children. When asked why Māori and Pasifika populations were less vaccinated, Jackson had earlier suggested these groups could be marginalised in New Zealand and needed something other than the mainstream approaches if they were to be reached with the vaccine.

=== Shift in Government's response ===
After the Delta variant had become established in New Zealand, Jacinda Ardern announced on 4 October 2021 a policy shift from elimination of the virus to a more mitigating suppression approach. Jackson said the arrival of Delta had pleasingly resulted in a rapid increase in the vaccination rate, [and] "elimination was never an endgame: it was only a strategy until you had a good vaccination. Fortunately, now we do." He expressed concerns about the loosening of some restrictions for the city of Auckland at the same time, noting that it may be risky and that the key point was still to get more people vaccinated. Jackson contributed to an article at the time which stated that if COVID-19 became endemic in New Zealand the healthcare system could be overwhelmed, and the move from the elimination strategy would still require keeping the case numbers low, with a continuation of "border protection, mask wearing, distancing, bubbles, contact tracing, testing of people and waste water, and vaccination."

On 19 October 2021, Jacinda Ardern made it clear that under the new approach, people who were unvaccinated would have some limitations of their everyday activities. Jackson told Radio New Zealand that the government needed to take the position of 'no jab no job, no fun', [because] "the only game in town is to buy time until we get everyone vaccinated." Jackson told the New Zealand Herald that it was necessary "to take a tough stance on people who don't follow the rules."

When the New Zealand Government announced a plan in December 2021 to loosen restrictions into the COVID-19 Protection Framework (also known as the 'Traffic Light' system), Jackson told Māni Dunlop on RNZ that the changes may have been well timed but that there were still "more than a million people in the country unvaccinated" and the concern was that if cases got into isolated communities with lower rates of vaccination, that would create problems. He further urged caution when actual changes were made to the alert levels and the opening of internal New Zealand boundaries in December 2021, noting on RNZ Morning Report that the key was to get everyone vaccinated and avoid needing to put in more controls and restrictions.

As New Zealand moved into the 'traffic light' system, Jackson drew attention to misinformation about the COVID vaccine that was causing vaccination hesitation. He told Newshub that the new restrictions will "keep vaccinated people safer because they're not going to have to interact as often with unvaccinated people, which will also give those who can't be vaccinated – such as children – better protection too...[and]...secondly, it should encourage even more people – a substantial proportion of those people are still vaccine hesitant – to get vaccinated."

=== Arrival of Omicron variant ===
On the 17 December 2021, Jackson explained that some of the implications for New Zealand of the arrival of the Omicron variant included the need to bring boosters of the vaccine forward and possibly a review of the opening of the borders scheduled for January 2022 which could affect overseas travel plans. He said that the goal should be to keep the variant out of the country for as long as possible. Changes made by the New Zealand Government late in December 2021 to reduce the time for getting boosters, allowing for the vaccination of children and extending the date for quarantine-free entry for New Zealanders returning from Australia, were seen by Jackson as significant in managing the possibility of an Omicron outbreak in the country. He told Radio New Zealand that during the pandemic, every decision made by a Government was about balancing the risk to health and the risk to the economy, but New Zealand was in a good position because the population was recently vaccinated, it was summer and schools were on holiday. He later said that the holiday period for New Zealanders still required caution, despite high rates of vaccination in most areas. By the end of December 2021, after the first border-related case of Omicron was detected as having been active in the New Zealand community, Jackson said that it could be an historical case, but was likely to have been caught in managed quarantine, and the Government should be "very seriously considering requiring a rapid antigen test before people board a plane to NZ. I don't think a PCR within 72 hours works." Jackson expressed confidence in New Zealand's response to Omicron in February 2022 due to the high levels of vaccination, but expressed concern for those who were still unvaccinated. He noted that while Omicron was likely to be less severe than Delta, unvaccinated people were very vulnerable in terms of "mortality and hospitalisations."

By 6 March 2022 as the daily numbers of reported cases of COVID-19 in New Zealand were reducing, the Ministry of Health urged caution, suggesting that the figures may be related to delays in people self-reporting Rapid Antigen Test (RAT) results and quoted Jackson as saying [that] "a lot of people have given up reporting, so I take next to no notice of the cases anymore. I look at the hospitalisations and the deaths." Jackson said that it was unclear whether or not Auckland had reached its peak of the Omicron outbreak, but agreed for the need to be cautious because the variant was only less severe if people were fully vaccinated. In a later interview on Radio New Zealand, Jackson said the daily numbers were not important because with self-reporting, there was a loss of control of the data and ideally RATs should be done with trained people to ensure the information was reported accurately. He acknowledged that the New Government needed to review the isolation times and be pragmatic so that supply chains were not impacted, but it was crucial to keep the hospital system fully functioning as long as possible.

As the focus on COVID-19 in New Zealand shifted from just a daily count of numbers of cases and more into consideration of whether or not Omicron had peaked, Jackson said that as of 14 March 2022, it was too early to call if this was the case in the whole country. He noted that the virus ran in ongoing waves, pointing out the increases of infections overseas, and suggested that the New Zealand Government "may have taken too many restrictions off too early" and recommended that basic restriction that were not too disruptive, such as wearing of masks in public places and sensible social distancing, should be kept in place with a continued focus on people fully vaccinated. Prior to the announcement by the New Zealand Government of proposed relaxation of some of the measures in place to manage Omicron, Jackson said on 21 March 2022 that he felt it was too soon to relax and that the push for change seemed to be 'politicking'. He noted that more than one million New Zealanders still needed to get their booster shot, "the unvaccinated are twice as likely to catch Covid-19, three times as likely to transmit it as fully boosted people and five times more likely to be in hospital...[concluding that]...it just doesn't make any sense to be relaxing public health measures that have proven to be incredibly effective at the peak of an outbreak."

When questions were raised in April 2022 about the exact number of daily COVID-19 cases in the New Zealand community, Jackson said this was most likely because so many people were not reporting the results of their rapid antigen tests (RAT). While he did not see a return to PCR testing as being feasible with high numbers of community cases, Jackson did suggest that an upgrade of the testing system was desperately needed. He accepted that RAT testing was widely being used, but noted that "expecting people to report the results of self-administered RAT tests was never going to happen on a consistent basis...[because]...they are only reliable if they are done by trained people and recorded."

On 11 September 2022, Jacinda Ardern announced that most elements of the COVID-19 Protection Framework in New Zealand were to be dropped. Jackson said the decision was reasonable because vaccination and prime infection appeared to be protecting people against the current variant, although a new variant was still a possibility. He did however, suggest that masks should still be worn on public transport and planes, but large, well-ventilated spaces raised fewer concerns.

== Notable students ==
Notable students of Jackson include Shanthi Ameratunga and Josephine Herman.

== Awards ==
In 2006 Jackson won the International Society of Hypertension Julius Award for contributions to hypertension research.

He was awarded the Peter Gluckman Medal for Distinguished Contribution to Research in 2009.

In 2014 Jackson received the Life Membership Award, Australasian Epidemiology Association.

In 2024 Jackson was elected as a Fellow of the Royal Society Te Apārangi.
