= Sunnykids =

Australian children's charitable organization

SunnyKids is a children's charitable organization on Australia's Sunshine Coast, Queensland. The organization helps accommodate women and children escaping domestic violence and family violence.

== History ==
The organization was founded in 1998. By 2003, SunnyKids was providing 7000 nights of accommodation per year, 75% to children, many representing the third or fourth generation of their family to live in refuge. Although 75% of people living with domestic violence in Australia are children, government practice has been to support only adults, viewing children as "accompanying" their parents. The logic behind this idea is that if the parent is helped, any dependent children will also have benefited, and therefore children do not require direct service.

Between 2003 and 2009, SunnyKids developed integrated support systems and child-focused programs. During this time accommodation provision grew to 10,000 nights per year

SunnyKids annually provides over 10,000 nights of emergency accommodation, 75 per cent of which is for children. Government subsidies are primarily directed towards supporting parents. Child specific supports are funded through donations and fundraising.
