= Sue Crengle =

New Zealand public health researcher

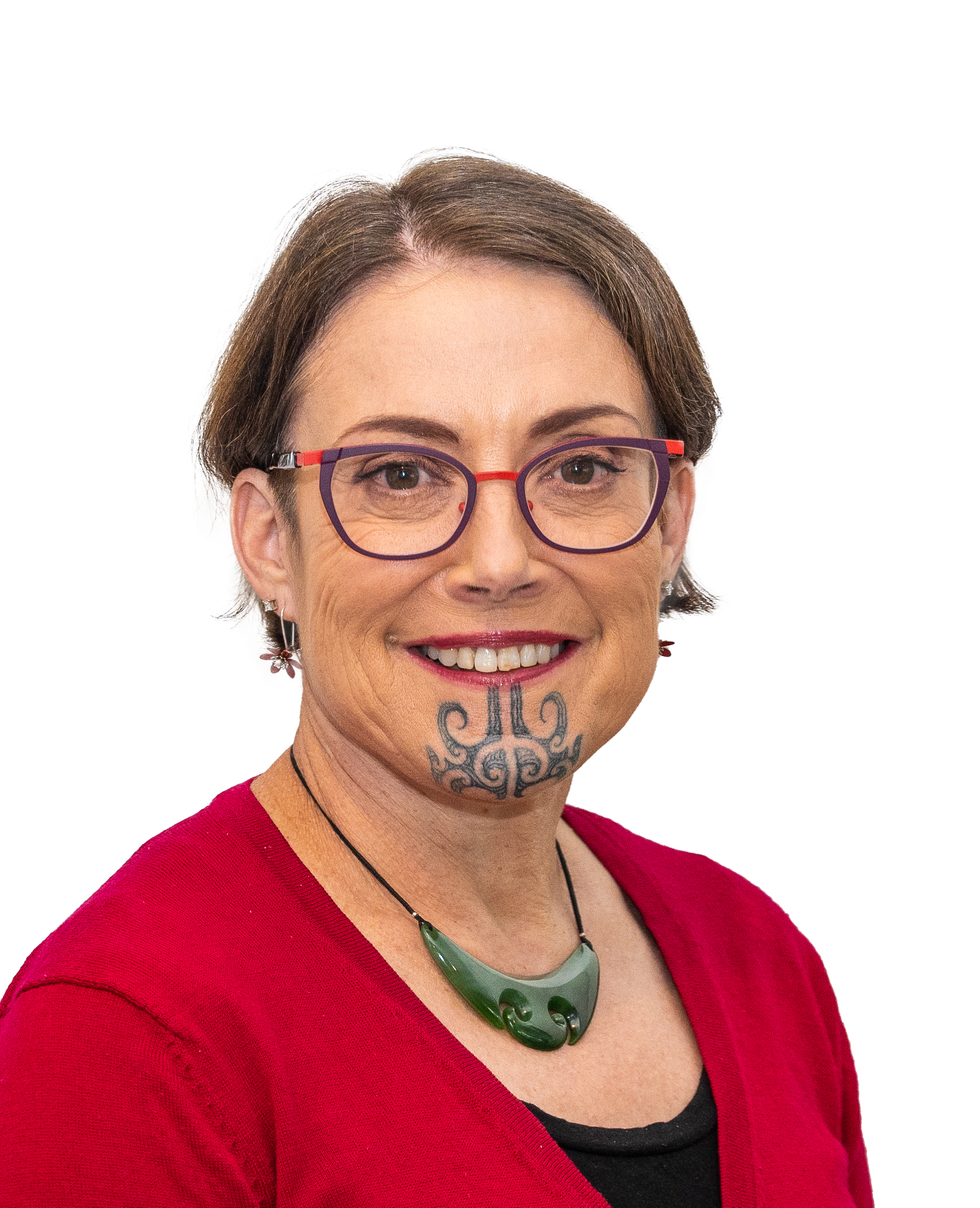
- Crengle in 2023
- Born: Waiouru, New Zealand

Academic background
- Education: University of Auckland
- Theses: Mā Papatuanuku, ka Tipu ngā Rākau: a case study of the well child health programme provided by Te Whānau O Waipareira Trust (1997); The management of children's asthma in primary care : Are there ethnic differences in care? (2008)
- Doctoral advisor: Paul Brown, Bruce Arroll

Suzanne Marie Crengle is a New Zealand Māori academic, of Kāti Māmoe, Kāi Tahu and Waitaha descent and as of 2020 is a full professor at the University of Otago, specialising in public health medicine.

== Early life ==
Crengle was born in Waiouru, and grew up in Wellington and Auckland. Her father was in the navy. She attended Mana College, where her parents had to complain to the local MP to have the streaming system changed so that it was possible for her to both be in the top class and take te reo Māōri.

== Academic career ==
Crengle graduated in medicine from the University of Auckland in 1985. She notes that there were three other Māori students in her class, whereas nowadays a typical cohort might have fifty. She then completed a master's degree titled Mā Papatuanuku, ka Tipu ngā Rākau: a case study of the well child health programme provided by Te Whānau O Waipareira Trust in 1997, supervised by Fiona Cram. She then completed a PhD titled The management of children's asthma in primary care: Are there ethnic differences in care? at the University of Auckland.

Crengle then moved to the University of Otago, rising to full professor. She resides in Invercargill, where she practises one day a week. Her research focuses on issues of inequity in the health system, where she says some metrics are getting worse, such as the percentage of Māori women participating in cervical screening. She also teaches in public health and Māori health at the university.

In 2021 she was appointed to the Māori Health Authority as part of the reformation of the health system. She said "It's exciting that there's such an explicit focus on equity and improving Māori health outcomes across the whole reform."

== Selected works ==
- Ian Anderson; Crengle, Sue; Martina Leialoha Kamaka; Tai-Ho Chen; Neal Palafox; Pulver, Lisa (2006). "Indigenous health in Australia, New Zealand, and the Pacific". The Lancet. 367 (9524): 1775–1785. doi:10.1016/s0140-6736(06)68773-4. PMID 16731273. Wikidata Q36491217.
- Grant, Cameron Charles; Stewart, Alistair W.; Scragg, Robert Keith Rhodes; Tania Milne; Judy Rowden; Ekeroma, Alec Joseph; Wall, Clare; Mitchell, Edwin Arthur; Crengle, Sue; Adrian Trenholme; Julian Crane; Carlos A Camargo (2013). "Vitamin D during pregnancy and infancy and infant serum 25-hydroxyvitamin D concentration". Pediatrics. 133 (1): e143-53. doi:10.1542/peds.2013-2602. PMID 24344104. Wikidata Q57385047.
- Mathijs F G Lucassen; Merry, Sally Nicola; Elizabeth M Robinson; Denny, Simon; Clark, Terryann Coralie; Ameratunga, Shanthi Neranjana; Crengle, Sue; Fiona V Rossen (2011). "Sexual attraction, depression, self-harm, suicidality and help-seeking behaviour in New Zealand secondary school students". Australian and New Zealand Journal of Psychiatry. 45 (5): 376–383. doi:10.3109/00048674.2011.559635. PMID 21361850. Wikidata Q48901132.
- Crengle, Sue; Robinson, Elizabeth; Ameratunga, Shanthi Neranjana; Clark, Terryann Coralie; Raphael, Deborah (2012). "Ethnic discrimination prevalence and associations with health outcomes: data from a nationally representative cross-sectional survey of secondary school students in New Zealand". BMC Public Health. 12: 45. doi:10.1186/1471-2458-12-45. PMC 3315751. PMID 22257643. Wikidata Q34132449.
