= Robyn Norton =

New Zealand health researcher

Robyn Ngaire Norton AO
- Born: 23 November 1955 (age 70); Christchurch, New Zealand
- Education: University of Canterbury; University of Sydney
- Scientific career
- Workplaces: University of New South Wales; Royal Free Hospital; National Institutes of Health
- Thesis: Cirrhosis of the liver and alcohol consumption in women (1988)
- Doctoral students: Shanthi Ameratunga

Robyn Ngaire Norton AO (born 23 November 1955) is a New Zealand health researcher who is James Martin Fellow and Professor of Public Health at the University of New South Wales. Her research considers women and girls' health. She is the Founder of the George Institute for Global Health.

== Early life and education ==
Norton is from Canterbury, New Zealand. She has said that she grew up in a family committed to equity and social justice. Her time in high school coincided with the rise of second-wave feminism, and Norton became interested in women's health. She remained in New Zealand for her undergraduate studies, earning a master's degree at the University of Canterbury. During her master's programme she evaluated the ergonomics of kitchen design in New Zealand. She moved to the University of Sydney for a master's of public health. Norton remained at the University of Sydney for her doctoral research, where she studied cirrhosis of the liver in women. After completing her PhD research, Norton was a postdoctoral researcher at the Royal Free Hospital and National Institutes of Health.

== Research and career ==
Norton has focused her career to improving the health outcomes of women. In 1999, she founded the George Institute for Global Health, a non-profit which she continues to lead as Director. The institute seeks to understand the global burden of disease in lower and middle-income countries, improve the expertise of such countries in handling an epidemic and to emphasise the importance of maternal and child health. In 2011 the George Institute for Global Health was one of the world's top ten research institutions. The institute works on non-communicable diseases, which are the leading cause of death for women worldwide.

Her research considers the causes, prevention and management of injuries. In this capacity, she serves as Chair of the Road Traffic Injuries Research Network.

Norton's notable students include Shanthi Ameratunga.

== Awards and honours ==
- 2016 Elected Fellow of the Australian Academy of Health and Medical Sciences
- 2017 Officer of the Order of Australia
- Elected Fellow of the Royal Society of Medicine
- 2019 The Australian Financial Review Australia's Top Women of Influence

== Selected publications ==
- Campbell, A J.; Robertson, M C.; Gardner, M. M; Norton, R. N; Tilyard, M. W; Buchner, D. M (25 October 1997). "Randomised controlled trial of a general practice programme of home based exercise to prevent falls in elderly women". BMJ. 315 (7115): 1065–1069. doi:10.1136/bmj.315.7115.1065. ISSN 0959-8138. PMC 2127698. PMID 9366737.
- The RENAL Replacement Therapy Study Investigators (22 October 2009). "Intensity of Continuous Renal-Replacement Therapy in Critically Ill Patients". New England Journal of Medicine. 361 (17): 1627–1638. doi:10.1056/NEJMoa0902413.
- Connor, Jennie; Norton, Robyn; Ameratunga, Shanthi; Robinson, Elizabeth; Civil, Ian; Dunn, Roger; Bailey, John; Jackson, Rod (11 May 2002). "Driver sleepiness and risk of serious injury to car occupants: population based case control study". BMJ. 324 (7346): 1125. doi:10.1136/bmj.324.7346.1125. ISSN 0959-8138. PMC 107904. PMID 12003884.
