= Postvention =

A postvention is an intervention conducted after a suicide, largely taking the form of support for the bereaved (family, friends, professionals and peers). Family and friends of the suicide victim may be at increased risk of suicide themselves. Postvention is a term that was first coined by Shneidman (1972), which he used to describe "appropriate and helpful acts that come after a dire event." In Shneidman's view, "the largest public health problem is neither the prevention of suicide nor the management of suicide attempts, but the alleviation of the effects of stress in the survivors whose lives are forever altered." Postvention is a process that has the objective of alleviating the effects of this stress and helping survivors to cope with the loss they have just experienced.

The aim is to support and debrief those affected; and reduce the possibility of copycat suicide. Interventions recognize that those bereaved by suicide may be vulnerable to suicidal behaviour themselves and may develop complicated grief reactions.

Postvention includes procedures to alleviate the distress of suicidally bereaved individuals, reduce the risk of imitative suicidal behavior, and promote the healthy recovery of the affected community. Postvention can also take many forms depending on the situation in which the suicide takes place. Schools and colleges may include postvention strategies in overall crisis plans. These strategies are designed to prevent suicide clusters and to help students cope with the emotions of loss that follow the suicide of a friend. Individual and group counseling may be offered for survivors (people affected by the suicide of an individual).

== Organizations ==
The Suicide Aftercare Association , a 501(c)(3) public charity, was formed to reduce the possibility of suicide contagion and secondary suicides by performing biohazardous cleaning of suicide attempt and completion scenes so families are relieved of this burden.

== Programs ==
=== Responding to Loss (RTL) ===
Responding to Loss (RTL) is one of the crisis response programs that has been used to deal with postvention at high schools. This program is part of the Community Action for Youth Survival (CAYS), which is a three-year adolescent suicide prevention project serving three counties in the Chicago area. The objective of RTL is to provide strategies that will help high school crisis teams develop a structured response to the suicide of any student or member of the staff. There are three components to this program. The first is Preparing for Crisis Training, the second is Peer Witness Intervention, and the third is Crisis Consultation. This program proved to be quite successful during its trial and the participants of the program were generally satisfied with the training that they received. As a result of this program, several schools have developed or revised their crisis team in response to a suicide. They have done this by following the Preparing for Crisis training aspect of the program and also through consulting with the CAYS program.

=== LOSS ===
The LOSS Program includes a first-response team with the objectives of delivering immediate services to the survivors of a suicide at the time of the death. This team is made up of para-professional survivor volunteers and staff members of the Baton Rouge Crisis Intervention Center, located in Baton Rouge, Louisiana. The LOSS Program is different from other postvention programs in several ways. First, the LOSS team physically goes to the scenes of the suicides to begin helping the survivors to cope with their loss as close to the event of death as possible. Members of this team can provide access to the needed resources and can begin the grieving process at the scene of the death. Second, since the LOSS team includes survivor volunteers at the scene, an immediate and meaningful bond is established between the newly bereaved individuals and the para-professional surveyor team members. This bond allows for the start of a conversation between the bereaved and the crisis team members about grief and the potential for hope after suicide. Third, the LOSS team has a strong relationship with other first responders, such as law enforcement, emergency services, fire departments, funeral home representatives, and more. This relationship allows the newly bereaved to have a larger variety of choices in regards to coping with a suicide compared to other survivors who might not have access to this program. This model of postvention provides referrals for additional support to all survivors and individuals at the scene of the suicide The model of the LOSS Program has changed the scene of the suicide to a more "concerned and caring environment" for all individuals and survivors.
