= BMC Public Health =

Peer-reviewed scientific journal

- Discipline: Public health
- Language: English

Publication details
- Publisher: BioMed Central
- Impact factor: 4.4 (2025)

Standard abbreviations
- ISO 4: BMC Public Health

Indexing
- ISSN: 1471-2458

Links
- Journal homepage; Online archive

BMC Public Health is a peer-reviewed open-access scientific journal that covers epidemiology of disease and various aspects of public health. The journal was established in 2001 and is published by BioMed Central.

== Abstracting and indexing ==
The journal is abstracted and indexed:

- Chemical Abstracts Service
- EBSCO databases
- ProQuest
- Scopus
- Science Citation Index Expanded

According to the Journal Citation Reports, the journal has a 2025 impact factor of 4.4.
