= Journal of Paediatrics and Child Health =

- Discipline: Pediatrics
- Language: English
- Edited by: Ju-Lee Oei

Publication details
- Former name: Australian Paediatric Journal
- History: 1965-present
- Publisher: John Wiley & Sons
- Frequency: Bimonthly
- Impact factor: 1.954 (2020)

Standard abbreviations
- ISO 4: J. Paediatr. Child Health

Indexing
- CODEN: JPCHE3
- ISSN: 1034-4810 (print); 1440-1754 (web)
- OCLC no.: 767992225

Links
- Journal homepage; Online access; Online archive

The Journal of Paediatrics and Child Health is a bimonthly peer-reviewed medical journal covering pediatrics. It was established in 1965 as the Australian Paediatric Journal, obtaining its current name in 1990. It is published by John Wiley & Sons on behalf of the Royal Australasian College of Physicians' Paediatrics and Child Health Division, of which it is the official journal. The editor-in-chief is Ju-Lee Oei (University of New South Wales). According to the Journal Citation Reports, the journal has a 2020 impact factor of 1.954, ranking it 80th out of 129 journals in the category "Pediatrics".
