= Shanthi Ameratunga =

New Zealand public health academic

- Education: University of Auckland
- Scientific career
- Fields: Public Health
- Workplaces: University of Auckland
- Thesis: Disability following car crashes: an epidemiological investigation (2005)
- Doctoral advisor: Robyn Norton; Rod Jackson
- Doctoral students: Josephine Herman

Shanthi Neranjana Ameratunga is a New Zealand public health academic. As of September 2018, she is currently a full professor at the University of Auckland.

== Academic career ==
After a 2005 PhD titled 'Disability following car crashes: an epidemiological investigation' at the University of Auckland, supervised by Robyn Norton and Rod Jackson, Ameratunga joined the staff, rising to full professor.

Ameratunga's work involves car accidents, alcohol, trauma, disabilities and rehabilitation. In 2020, she served on “A future for the world’s children?”, a WHO-UNICEF-Lancet Commission, co-chaired by Helen Clark and Awa Coll-Seck.

Notable students of Ameratunga include Josephine Herman.

== Selected works ==
- Connor, Jennie, Robyn Norton, Shanthi Ameratunga, Elizabeth Robinson, Ian Civil, Roger Dunn, John Bailey, and Rod Jackson. "Driver sleepiness and risk of serious injury to car occupants: population based case control study." BMJ 324, no. 7346 (2002): 1125.
- Salkeld, G., Shanthi N. Ameratunga, I. D. Cameron, R. G. Cumming, S. Easter, J. Seymour, S. E. Kurrle, S. Quine, and Paul M. Brown. "Quality of life related to fear of falling and hip fracture in older women: a time trade off studyCommentary: Older people's perspectives on life after hip fractures." BMJ 320, no. 7231 (2000): 341–346.
- Ameratunga, Shanthi, Martha Hijar, and Robyn Norton. "Road-traffic injuries: confronting disparities to address a global-health problem." The Lancet 367, no. 9521 (2006): 1533–1540.
- Feigin, Valery L., Alice Theadom, Suzanne Barker-Collo, Nicola J. Starkey, Kathryn McPherson, Michael Kahan, Anthony Dowell et al. "Incidence of traumatic brain injury in New Zealand: a population-based study." The Lancet Neurology 12, no. 1 (2013): 53–64.
- Blows, Stephanie, Shanthi Ameratunga, Rebecca Q. Ivers, Sing Kai Lo, and Robyn Norton. "Risky driving habits and motor vehicle driver injury." Accident Analysis & Prevention 37, no. 4 (2005): 619–624.
- Blows, Stephanie, Rebecca Q. Ivers, Jennie Connor, Shanthi Ameratunga, Mark Woodward, and Robyn Norton. "Marijuana use and car crash injury." Addiction 100, no. 5 (2005): 605–611.
